2017 in sports describes the year's events in world sport.

Calendar by month

January

February

March

April

May

June

July

August

September

October

November

December

Air sports

Aerobatics
 July 9 – 17: 5th FAI World YAK 52 Aerobatic Championship in  Tula
 Overall winner:  Oleg Shpolianskii
 Overall teams winners:  (Oleg Shpolianskii, Vladimir Kotelnikov)
 July 27 – August 5: 8th FAI World Advanced Glider Aerobatic Championships in  Toruń
 Overall Advanced winners: 1st.  Gustav Salminen, 2nd.  Erwin George, 3rd:  Michał Klimaszewski
 Advanced Teams winners: 1st:  (Michał Klimaszewski, Agata Nykaza, Mirosław Wrześniewski), 2nd:  (Erwin George, Benoit Madrenas, Eric Lanquetin), 3rd:  (Ciprian Lupaș, Valentin Hota, Gál Zsolt)
 July 27 – August 5: 20th FAI World Glider Aerobatic Championships in  Toruń
 Overall Unlimited winners: 1st.  Ferenc Tóth, 2nd:  János Szilágyi, 3rd:  Luca Bertossio
 Unlimited Teams winners: 1st:  (Ferenc Tóth, János Szilágyi, János Sonkoly), 2nd:  (Moritz Kirchberg, Eugen Schaal, Marvin Woltering), 3rd:  (Siegfried Mayr, Gabriel Stangl, Bernhard Behr)
 August 3 – 13: 10th FAI European Advanced Aerobatic Championships in  Chotěboř
 Winners: 1st:  Dmitriy Samokhvalov, 2nd:  Loïc Lovicourt, 3rd:  Roman Ovchinnikov
 Teams winners: 1st: , 2nd: , 3rd: 
 August 16 – 26: 29th FAI World Aerobatic Championships in  Malalane

Model aircraft

Events
 February 19 – 25: 2017 FAI F3P World Championship for Indoor Aerobatic Model Aircraft in  Strasbourg
 Winner:  Gernot Bruckmann
 Junior winner:  Felix Scander
 Team winners: 
 March 13 – 17: 2017 FAI F1D European Championships for Free Flight Indoor Model Aircraft in  Slănic
 Winner:  Ivan Treger
 Junior winner:  Călin Bulai
 Teams winner: 
 Junior Teams winner: 
 July 16 – 22: 2017 FAI F3J European Championship for Model Gliders in  Martin
 Seniors winners: 1st place:  Arijan Hucaljuk, 2nd place:  Oleksander Chekh, 3rd place:  Manuel Reinecke
 Juniors winners: 1st place:  Ivaylo Dimitrov, 2nd place:  Marco Gallizia, 3rd place:  Oskar Stempihar
 Seniors teams winners: 1st place: , 2nd place: , 3rd place: 
 Juniors teams winners: 1st place: , 2nd place: , 3rd place: 
 July 21 – 30: 2017 FAI F3 World Championships for Model Helicopters in  Włocławek
 F3C Seniors winners: 1st place:  Ennio Graber, 2nd place:  Hiroki Ito, 3rd place:  Pierre Gutierrez
 F3C Juniors winners: 1st place:  Axel Mondet, 2nd place:  Thomas Rettenbacher, 3rd place:  Tianshi AN
 F3C Teams winners: 1st place: , 2nd place: , 3rd place: 
 F3N Seniors winners: 1st place:  Ko Huan-chen, 2nd place:  Eric Weber, 3rd place:  James Robertson
 F3N Juniors winners: 1st place:  Aaron Cole, 2nd place:  Samuel Aunbirk Jensen, 3rd place:  Marcel Doring
 F3N Teams winners: 1st place: , 2nd place: , 3rd place: 
 July 24 – 30: 2017 FAI F3K World Championship for Model Gliders in  Lviv
 Seniors winners: 1st place:  Nikola Frančić, 2nd place:  Cederic Duss, 3rd place:  Pierre Meunier
 Juniors winners: 1st place:  Augis Bražiūnas, 2nd place:  Nikita Sholom, 3rd place:  Christoph Ogi
 July 25 – 29: 2017 FAI F3D World Championship for Pylon Racing Model Aircraft in  Järna
 Seniors winners: 1st place:  Jiří Novotný, 2nd place:  Stefan Raeven, 3rd place:  Thomas Eriksson
 Juniors winners: 1st place:  Daniel Arapakis, 2nd place:  Bram Lentjes, 3rd place:  Johannes Reutenberg
 Teams winners: 1st place: , 2nd place: , 3rd place: 
 July 30 – August 6: 2017 FAI F1 Junior European Championships for Free Flight Model Aircraft in  Prilep
 F1A winners: 1st place:  Martin Bencik, 2nd place:  Alexey Khoroshev, 3rd place:  Sagi Brudni
 F1B winners: 1st place:  Bojan Gostojic, 2nd place:  Sebastian Jäckel, 3rd place:  Omri Sela
 F1P winners: 1st place:  Maksim Poliakov, 2nd place:  Ilya Trapeznikov, 3rd place:  Michał Krężel
 August 5 – 12: 2017 FAI F2 European Championships for Control Line Model Aircraft in  Békéscsaba
 F2A winners: 1st:  Luca Grossi, 2nd:  Ferenc Szvacsek, 3rd:  Oleksandr Osovyk
 Junior F2A winners: 1st:  Illia Rediuk, 2nd:  Alexey Emelyanov, 3rd:  Kacper Walania
 F2B winners: 1st:  Igor Burger, 2nd:  Marco Valiera, 3rd:  Zbynek Kravcik
 Junior F2B winners: 1st:  Yaroslav Fokin, 2nd:  Jan Kopriva, 3rd:  Mykola Kucher
 F2B Teams winners: 1st: , 2nd: , 3rd: 
 Junior F2C Teams winners: 1st: , 2nd: , 3rd: 
 F2D winners: 1st: , 2nd: , 3rd: 
 August 6 – 12: 2017 FAI F3B World Championship for Model Gliders in  Jeseník
 Winners: 1st:  Bernhard Flixeder, 2nd:  Andreas Herrig, 3rd:  Johannes Krischke
 August 6 – 13: 2017 FAI F1 World Championships for Free Flight Model Aircraft in  Szentes
 F1A winners: 1st:  Igor Bombek, 2nd:  Robert Lesko, 3rd:  Julien Sion
 F1A Teams winners: 1st: , 2nd: , 3rd: 
 F1B winners:  Stepan Stefanchuk,  Gilad Mark, 3rd:  Rolandas Mackus
 F1B Teams winners: 1st: , 2nd: , 3rd: 
 F1C winners: 1st:  Yuri Shvedenkov, 2nd:  Edward Burek, 3rd:  Raimond Naaber
 F1C Teams winners: 1st: , 2nd: , 3rd: 
 August 19 – 27: 2017 FAI S European Championships for Space Models in  Nowy Targ
 August 21 – 27: 2017 FAI F1E World Championships for Free Flight Model Aircraft in  Turda
 November 18 – 28: 2017 FAI F3A World Championship for Aerobatic Model Aircraft in

Hot air ballooning
 August 22 – 27: 20th FAI European Hot Air Balloon Championship in  Brissac-Quincé
 September 4 – 9: 4th FAI Women's European Hot Air Balloon Championship in  Leszno
 September 7 – 16: 61st Coupe Aéronautique Gordon Bennett in  Gruyères

General aviation

Events
 July 28 – August 3: 23rd FAI World Precision Flying Championship at  Spitzerberg Airport
 Winners: 1st:  Krzysztof Skrętowicz, 2nd:  Janusz Darocha, 3rd:  Michał Wieczorek
 Teams winners: 1st: , 2nd: , 3rd: 
 September 11 – 16: 1st FAI World Air Navigation Race Championship in  Castellón
 September 13 – 17: 54th National Championship Air Races at  Reno Stead Airport

Gliding
 January 8 – 21: 34th FAI World Gliding Championships in  Benalla
 15 m winner:  Sebastian Kawa
 18 m winner:  Killian Walbrou
 Open winner:  Russell Cheetham
 May 17 – June 4: 9th FAI Women's World Gliding Championship in  Zbraslavice
 Club winner:  Sabrina Vogt (Glasflügel H-201)
 Standard winner:  Aude Grangeray (Schempp-Hirth Discus-2)
 18 m winner:  Katrin Senne (Schleicher ASG 29)
 June 10 – 17: Uppsala Masters at  Sundbro Airport
 Class winner:  Jan-Ola Nordh
 Open winner:  Börje Eriksson
 June 29 – July 16: 2nd FAI World 13.5m Class Gliding Championship in  Szatymaz
 Winner:  Sebastian Kawa, 2nd place:  Uli Schwenk, 3rd place:  Sebastian Riera
 July 20 – August 6: 19th FAI European Gliding Championships in  Moravská Třebová
 Club winners: 1st:  Tim Kuijpers, 2nd:  Boris Zorz, 3rd:  Fabian Peitz
 Standard winners: 1st:  Pavel Louzecky, 2nd:  Miloslav Cink, 3rd:  Jeroen Jennen
 Double Seater winners: 1st:  (Kawa & Matkowski), 2nd:  (Jones & Coppin), 3rd:  (Cronjaeger & Heidemeyer)
 July 27 – August 13: 10th FAI Junior World Gliding Championships in  Kaunas
 Club winners: 1st:  Julian Klemm, 2nd:  Paul Altrichter, 3rd:  Stefan Langer
 Standard winners: 1st:  Sjoerd van Empelen, 2nd:  Ignas Bitinaitis, 3rd:  Joris Vainius
 August 10 – 26: 19th FAI European Gliding Championships at  Lasham Airfield
 November 26 – December 8: 2nd FAI Pan-American Gliding Championship in  Santa Rosa de Conlara

2017 Grand Prix gliding
 December 14 – 20, 2016: Sailplane Grand Prix #1 in  Horsham
 Winner:  Geoff Brown (Jonker JS-1 Revelation)
 March 26 – April 1: Sailplane Grand Prix #2 in  Orlando
 Winner:  Jerzy Szemplinski (Schleicher ASG 29)
 April 17 – 22: Sailplane Grand Prix #3 in  Magaliesburg
 Winner:  Laurens Goudriaan (Jonker JS-1 Revelation)
 May 7 – 14: Sailplane Grand Prix #4 in  Santa Cilia
 Winner:  Jon Gatfield (Schleicher ASG 29)
 May 27 – June 3: Sailplane Grand Prix #5 in  Wrocław
 Winner:  Sebastian Kawa (Jonker JS-1 Revelation)
 June 10 – 17: Sailplane Grand Prix #6 in  Varese
 Winner:  Giorgio Galetto (Schempp-Hirth Ventus-3)
 June 25 – July 1: Sailplane Grand Prix #7 in  Buno-Bonnevaux
 Winner:  Christophe Abadie (Schleicher ASG 29)
 July 29 – August 5: Sailplane Grand Prix #8 in  Partizánske
 Winner:  Roman Mracek (Schleicher ASG 29)
 August 19 – 26: Sailplane Grand Prix #9 in  Celje
 Winner:  Boštjan Pristavec (Jonker JS-1 Revelation)
 January 1 – 31, 2018: Sailplane Grand Prix #10 in  Vitacura (World final)

Hang gliding
 July 24 – August 6: 20th FAI World Hang Gliding Class 2 Championship in  Aspres-sur-Buëch
 Class 2 winners: 1st:  Manfred Ruhmer, 2nd:  Jacques Bott, 3rd:  Franz Pacheiner
 Class 5 winners: 1st:  Patrick Chopard Lallier, 2nd:  Christopher Friedl, 3rd:  Walter Geppert
 August 6 – 19: 14th FAI Women's World Hang Gliding Championship in  Brasília
 Cancelled due to lack of pilots.
 August 6 – 19: 21st FAI World Hang Gliding Class 1 Championship in  Brasília
 Winners: 1st.  Petr Beneš, 2nd.  Alessandro Ploner, 3rd.  Christian Chiech
 Teams winners: 1st. , 2nd. , 3rd.

Ultralight aviation
 April 28 – May 7: 2017 FAI Asian-Oceanic Paramotor Championships in  Lopburi
 Winners: 1st place: , 2nd place: , 3rd place: 
 August 12 – 19: 14th FAI European Microlight Championships at the  Nagykanizsa Airport
 RAL1 class winner:  Jiri Krajcza
 RAL2 class winners:  (Petr Jonás & Lucie Krameriusová)
 RGL2 class winners:  (Alojzy Dernbach & Klaudia Laskowska)
 RWL1 class winner:  Andrey Shchekoldin
 RWL2 class winners:  (Maksim Semenov & Alfiia Semenova)
 August 26 – September 2: 2017 FAI European Paramotor Championships in  Přerov
 Winners: 1st.  Alex Mateos. 2nd:  Marie Mateos, 3rd:  Pierre Lefebvre

Parachuting

Paraski World Cup
 January 20 – 22: Paraski World Cup Series #1 in  Bad Leonfelden
 Winners:  Haibel Reinhold (m) /  Erica Franz (f)
 Junior winner:  Sebastian Graser
 Master Mix winner:  Andreas Fischer
 Team Combined winners:  HSV Red Bull Salzburg 1
 Individual accuracy winner:  Milan Palo
 February 3 – 5: Paraski World Cup Series #2 in  Unterammergau
 Winners:  Sebastian Graser (m) /  Magdalena Schwertl (f)
 Junior winner:  Sebastian Graser 
 Master Mix winner:  Toni Gruber
 Team Combined winners:  HSV Red Bull Salzburg 1
 February 17 – 19: Paraski World Cup Series #3 (final) in  Železná Ruda
 Winners:  Sebastian Graser (m) /  Magdalena Schwertl (f)
 Junior winner:  Sebastian Graser 
 Master Mix winner:  Toni Gruber
 Team Combined winners:  HSV Red Bull Salzburg 1

Events
 March 7 – 11: 16th FAI World Para-Ski Championships in  St. Johann in Tirol
 Individual winners:  Alexey Burenin (m) /  Magdalena Schwertl
 Team winners:  1 (Anton Filippov, Alexey Burenin, Ayaz Karimov, Artur Bikmetov) (m) /  (Magdalena Schwertl, Marina Kücher)
 Junior winner:  Sebastian Graser
 Master Mix winner:  Toni Gruber
 July 11 – 20: 41st CISM World Military Parachuting Championship in  Warendorf
 Individual Overall winners:  Elischa Weber (m) /  Olga Lepezina
 Juniors Overall winners:  Tianbo Gao (m) /  Darja Shastakovich (f)
 Nation Overall winners:  (m) /  (f)
 Formation team winners:  (m) /  (f)
 Individual Style winners:  Elischa Weber (m) /  Léocadie Ollivier de Pury (f)
 Individual Style Juniors winners:  Tianbo Gao (m) /  Darja Shastakovich (f)
 Individual Accuracy winners:  Miroslav Kříž (m) /  Siwei Liu (f)
 Individual Accuracy Juniors winners:  Zhang Zuolei (m) /  Darja Shastakovich (f)
 Team Accuracy winners:  (m) /  (f)
 August 7 – 12: 14th FAI European Formation Skydiving Championships in  Saarlouis
 Winners:  Hayabusa NMP PCH (m) /  VR4 France Femmes (f)
 Vertical Formation Skydiving winners:  Vertical Fly Station
 Formation Skydiving 8-Way winners:  Tanay-8
 August 7 – 12: 12th FAI World Cup of Artistic Events in  Saarlouis
 Freestyle winners: 1st: , 2nd: , 3rd: 
 Freefly winners: 1st:  2, 2nd: , 3rd:  1
 August 7 – 12: 21st FAI World Cup of Formation Skydiving in  Saarlouis
 Winners:  Hayabusa NMP PCH (m) /  VR4 France Femmes (f)
 Vertical Formation Skydiving winners:  SDC Core
 Formation Skydiving 8-Way winners:  Golden Knights
 August 7 – 12: 2nd FAI European Speed Skydiving Championships in  Saarlouis
 Winners: 1st:  Thomas Moritz Friess, 2nd:  Charles Hurd, 3rd:  Henrik Raimer
 August 7 – 12: 7th FAI European Canopy Formation Championships in  Saarlouis
 2-Way Sequential winners: 1st:  France CF A, 2nd:  Russia CF, 3rd:  France CF B
 August 7 – 12: 3rd FAI World Cup of Speed Skydiving in  Saarlouis
 Winners: 1st:  Thomas Moritz Friess, 2nd:  Charles Hurd, 3rd:  Henrik Raimer
 August 7 – 12: 11th FAI European Artistic Events Championships in  Saarlouis
 Freestyle winners: 1st: , 2nd: , 3rd: 
 Freefly winners:  2, 2nd:  1, 3rd: 
 August 7 – 12: 9th FAI World Cup of Canopy Formation in  Saarlouis
 2-Way Sequential winners: 1st:  France CF A, 2nd:  Russia CF, 3rd:  France CF B
 August 24 – 31: 6th FAI Junior European Freefall Style and Accuracy Landing Championships in  Podgorica
 Juniors Overall winners:  Petr Chladek (m) /  Maria Elkina (f)
 Individual Accuracy Juniors winners:  Petr Chladek (m) /  Maria Elkina (f)
 Individual Style Juniors winners:  Lukas Tschech (m) /  Kseniia Fominykh (f)
 August 24 – 31: 9th FAI European Freefall Style and Accuracy Landing Championships in  Podgorica
 Individual Overall winners:  Jiri Gecnuk (m) /  Liubov Ekshikeeva (f)
 Individual Accuracy winners:  István Asztalos (m) /  Nataliia Nikitsiuk (f)
 Individual Style winners:  Libor Jirousek (m) /  Liubov Ekshikeeva (f)
 Team Accuracy winners:  (m) /  (f)
 Nation Overall winners:  (m) /  (f)
 October 20 – 22: 2nd FAI World Indoor Skydiving Championships in  Laval
 Open 4-Way Formation Tournament winners: 1st.  1, 2nd. , 3rd. 
 Women's 4-Way Formation Tournament winners: 1st.  1, 2nd. , 3rd. 
 Junior 4-Way Formation Tournament winners: 1st.  1, 2nd. , 3rd. 
 Vertical Formation Skydiving winners: 1st.  1, 2nd. , 3rd. 
 Dynamic 2-Way Tournament winners: 1st.  1, 2nd. , 3rd. 
 Dynamic 4-Way Tournament winners: 1st. , 2nd. , 3rd. 
 Open Indoor Freestyle winners: 1st. , 2nd. , 3rd. 
 Junior Indoor Freestyle winners: 1st. , 2nd. , 3rd. 
 November 2 – 8: 2nd FAI World Cup of Wingsuit Flying in 
 Wingsuit Performance winners: 1st.  Chris Geiler, 2nd.  Alexey Galda, 3rd.  Travis Mickle
 Wingsuit Acrobatic winners: 1st.  2 (Wicked Wingsuits), 2nd.  1 (Flatspin), 3rd.  (Sky Republic)
 November 27 – December 1: 9th FAI World Cup of Canopy Piloting in  Dubai

Paragliding

2017 Paragliding World Cup
 January 17 – 28: World Cup Superfinal in  Governador Valadares
 Men's winner:  Aaron Durogati
 Women's winner:  Seiko Fukuoka Naville
 Teams winner:  Gin Gliders
 May 20 – 27: Paragliding World Cup #1 in  Cœur de Savoie
 Men's winner:  Luc Armant
 Women's winner:  Méryl Delferriere
 Teams winner:  Ozone Paragliders ( Russel Ogden,  Luc Armant,  Honorin Hamard,  Seiko Fukuoka Naville)
 June 17 – 24: Paragliding World Cup #2 in  Niš
 Men's winner:  Stéphane Drouin
 Women's winner:  Atsuko Yamashita
 Teams winners:  Air'G Products ( Hernan Pitocco,  Jošt Napret,  Richard Gallon,  Daria Krasnova)
 August 5 – 12: Paragliding World Cup #3 in  Disentis
 Men's winner:  Alfredo Studer
 Women's winner:  Seiko Fukuoka Naville
 Teams winner:  Ozone Paragliders ( Charles Cazaux,  Julien Wirtz,  Seiko Fukuoka Naville,  Ulrich Prinz)
 September 2 – 9: Paragliding World Cup #4 in  Pico do Gavião
 Men's winner:  Rafael Saldini
 Women's winner:  Silvia Buzzi Ferraris
 Teams winner:  Kortel Design (Clayton Resende, Marcelo Prieto, Rafael Saldini, Marcella Uchôa)
 October 28 – November 4: Paragliding World Cup #5 in  Guayaquil
 Men's winner:  Honorin Hamard
 Women's winner:  Yael Margelisch
 Teams winner:  Ozone Paragliders
 January 9 – 20, 2018: 2017 Paragliding World Cup Superfinal in  Roldanillo

2017 Paragliding Accuracy World Cup
 March 16 – 20: Paragliding Accuracy World Cup #1 in  Manado
 Winners:  Rio Indrakusumah (m) /  Kang In-suk
 Teams winners:  Garuda Prima 6
 April 7 – 9: Paragliding Accuracy World Cup #2 in  Vršac
 Winners:  Indra Lesmana (m) /  Rika Wijayanti (f)
 Teams winners:  Garuda Prima 2
 July 21 – 23: Paragliding Accuracy World Cup #3 in  Mont-Saint-Pierre, Quebec
 Winners:  Hening Paradigma (m) /  Sirin Milawati (f)
 Teams winners:  Garuda Prima 1
 September 22 – 24: Paragliding Accuracy World Cup #4 in  Kobarid (final)
 Winners:  Tomas Lednik (m) /  Marketa Tomaskova (f)
 Teams winners:  No Name Team (Goran Djurkovic, Dragan Popov, Dejan Valek, Ivan Pavlov)

Other in Paragliding
 January 19 – 22: 1st Paragliding ASEAN Friendships Open in  Nong Khai
 Overall winner:  Tanapat Luangam
 Women's winner:  Nannapat Phuchong
 Teams winner:  Bueng Kan
 May 5 – 14: 9th FAI World Paragliding Accuracy Championship in  Vlorë
 Winner:  Tzvetan Tzolov (Gradient Bright 5)
 Women's winner:  Nunnapat Puchong
 Team winners: 
 July 1 – 15: 15th FAI World Paragliding Championship in  Pedavena
 Overall winner:  Pierre Remy
 Women's winner:  Seiko Fukuoka Naville
 Teams winners:  (Pierre Remy, Honorin Hamard, Luc Armant, Julien Wirtz, Laurie Genovese)

Alpine skiing

Amateur boxing

American football

 Super Bowl LI – the New England Patriots (AFC) won 34–28 (OT) over the Atlanta Falcons (NFC)
Location: NRG Stadium
Attendance: 70,807
MVP: Tom Brady, QB (New England)

Aquatics

Archery

 November 26, 2016 – October 22, 2017: WA's Calendar of Events

Indoor archery
 November 26 & 27, 2016: IA World Cup #1 in  Marrakesh
 Recurve winners:  Brady Ellison (m) /  Bryony Pitman (f)
 Compound winners:  Stephan Hansen (m) /  Danelle Wentzel (f)
 December 10 & 11, 2016: IA World Cup #2 in  Bangkok
 Recurve winners:  KIM Jae-hyeong (m) /  SONG Ji-yung (f)
 Compound winners:  Mike Schloesser (m) /  Sarah Prieels (f)
 January 20 – 22: IA World Cup #3 in  Nîmes
 Recurve winners:  Jean-Charles Valladont (m) /  Claudia Mandia (f)
 Compound winners:  Stephan Hansen (m) /  Tanja Jensen (f)
 February 10 – 12: IA World Cup #4 (final) in  Las Vegas
 Recurve winners:  Brady Ellison (m) /  PARK Se-hui (f)
 Compound winners:  Mike Schloesser (m) /  Tanja Jensen (f)
 March 7 – 12: 2017 WAE Indoor European Archery Championships in  Vittel
 Recurve winners:  David Pasqualucci (m) /  Veronika Marchenko (f)
 Team Recurve winners:  (Marco Galiazzo, Massimiliano Mandia, David Pasqualucci) (m) /  (Karolina Farasiewicz, Natalia Leśniak, Wioleta Myszor)
 Junior Recurve winners:  Erdal Meriç Dal (m) /  Tatiana Andreoli (f)
 Junior Team Recurve winners:  (Thomas Chirault, Thomas Koenig, Valentin Ripaux) /  (Tatiana Andreoli, Tanya Giaccheri, Vanessa Landi)
 Compound winners:  Jacopo Polidori (m) /  Alexandra Savenkova (f)
 Team Compound winners:  (Michele Nencioni, Sergio Pagni, Jacopo Polidori) /  (Erika Anear, Tanja Jensen, Sarah Sonnichsen) (f)
 Junior Compound winners:  Nico Wiener (m) /  Mariya Shkolna (f)
 Junior Team Compound winners:  (Christoffer Berg, Simon Olsen, Sune Rasmussen) /  (Emily Hoim, Lisell Jaatma, Meeri-Marita Paas) (f)

Outdoor archery
 May 16 – 21: WA World Cup #1 in  Shanghai
 Recurve winners:  Steve Wijler (m) /  Ki Bo-bae (f)
 Compound winners:  Stephan Hansen (m) /  Sara López (f)
 Recurve Team winners:  (m) /  (f)
 Compound Team winners:  (m) /  (f)
 Mixed Team winners:  (Compound) /  (Recurve)
 June 6 – 11: WA World Cup #2 in  Antalya
 Recurve winners:  Jean-Charles Valladont (m) /  Ksenia Perova (f)
 Compound winners:  Chen Hsiang-Hsuan (m) /  Sarah Sonnichsen (f)
 Recurve Team winners:  (m) /  (f)
 Compound Team winners:  (m) /  (f)
 Mixed Team winners:  (Compound) /  (Recurve)
 June 20 – 25: WA World Cup #3 in  Salt Lake City
 Recurve winners:  Im Dong-hyun (m) /  Chang Hye-jin (f)
 Compound winners:  Mike Schloesser (m) /  Andrea Marcos (f)
 Recurve Team winners:  (m) /  (f)
 Compound Team winners:  (m) /  (f)
 Mixed Team winners:  (Compound) /  (Recurve)
 August 8 – 13: WA World Cup #4 in  Berlin
 Recurve winners:  Kim Woo-jin (m) /  KANG Chae-young (f)
 Compound winners:  Demir Elmaağaçlı (m) /  Sarah Sonnichsen (f)
 Recurve Team winners:  (m) /  (f)
 Compound Team winners: The  (m) / The  (f)
 Mixed Team winners: The  (Compound) /  (Recurve)
 August 22 – 26: 2017 WAE Field Archery European Championships in  Mokrice Catez
  won both the gold and overall medal tallies.
 September 2 & 3: WA World Cup #5 (final) in  Rome
 Recurve winners:  Kim Woo-jin (m) /  Ki Bo-bae (f)
 Compound winners:  Braden Gellenthien (m) /  Sara López (f)
 Mixed Team winners:  (Compound) /  (Recurve)
 September 12 – 17: 2017 World Para Archery Championships in  Beijing
 Recurve winners:  ZHAO Lixue (m) /  Zahra Nemati (f)
 Compound winners:  AI Xinliang (m) /  ZHOU Jiamin (f)
 W1 winners:  Jeff Fabry (m) /  Jessica Stretton (f)
 Mixed Team winners:  (Compound) /  (Recurve)
 Recurve Team winners:  (m) /  (f)
 Compound Team winners:  (m) /  (f)
 W1 Team winners:  (m) /  (f)
 September 19 – 24: 2017 World Archery 3D Championships in  Robion
 Barebow winners:  Cesar Vera Bringas (m) /  Jessica Lindblom (f)
 Compound winners:  Joan Pauner (m) /  Ama Aude (f)
 Instinctive Bow winners:  Zibrandt Christensen (m) /  Heldis Zahlberger (f)
 Longbow winners:  Robin Gardeur (m) /  Giulia Barbaro (f)
 Team winners:  (m) /  (f)
 October 2 – 8: 2017 World Youth Archery Championships in  Rosario
 Junior Recurve winners:  JEONG Tae-yeong (m) /  KIM Kyoung-eun (f)
 Cadet Recurve winners:  TANG Chih-Chun (m) /  PARK So-hui (f)
 Junior Compound winners:  Curtis Broadnax (m) /  Alexis Ruiz (f)
 Cadet Compound winners:  Bryan Alvarado Fernandez (m) /  Lucy Mason (f)
 Junior Recurve Team winners:  (m) /  (f)
 Cadet Recurve Team winners:  (m) /  (f)
 Mixed Recurve Team winners:  (junior) /  (cadet)
 Junior Compound Team winners:  (m) /  (f)
 Cadet Compound Team winners:  (m) /  (f)
 Mixed Compound Team winners:  (junior) /  (cadet)
 October 15 – 22: 2017 World Archery Championships in  Mexico City
  won both the gold and overall medal tallies.

Association football

Athletics (track and field)

Badminton

Baseball

World Baseball Classic
 March 7 – 22: 2017 World Baseball Classic (championship game at Dodger Stadium in  Los Angeles)
 The  defeated , 8–0, to win their first World Baseball Classic title.  took third place.

Major League Baseball
April 2 – October 1: 2017 Major League Baseball season
 American League winners:  Houston Astros
 National League winners:  Los Angeles Dodgers
June 12 – 14: 2017 Major League Baseball draft in  Secaucus, New Jersey
 #1 pick:  Royce Lewis (to the  Minnesota Twins from  JSerra Catholic High School)
July 11: 2017 Major League Baseball All-Star Game in  Miami at Marlins Park
 The American League defeated the National League, 2–1.
 MVP:  Robinson Canó ( Seattle Mariners)
 2017 Major League Baseball Home Run Derby winner:  Aaron Judge ( New York Yankees)
 2017 All-Star Futures Game MVP:  Brent Honeywell ( Tampa Bay Rays)
October 24 – November 1: 2017 World Series
 The  Houston Astros defeated the  Los Angeles Dodgers, 4–3 in games played, to win their first World Series title.

WBSC
 July 28 – August 6: 2017 12U Baseball World Cup in  Tainan
 The  defeated , 7–2, to win their third consecutive 12U Baseball World Cup title.  took third place.
 September 1 – 10: 2017 U-18 Baseball World Cup in  Thunder Bay
 The  defeated , 8–0, to win their fourth consecutive and ninth overall U-18 Baseball World Cup title.  took third place.

Little League Baseball tournaments
 July 29 – August 5: 2017 Senior League World Series in  Easley
  Team Latin America (Aguadulce, Coclé) defeated  Team Southeast ( Coral Springs), 5–4, in the final.
 July 30 – August 6: 2017 Intermediate League World Series in  Livermore
  Team Puerto Rico defeated  Team East, 6–5, in the final.
 August 13 – 20: 2017 Junior League World Series in  Taylor
  Team Asia–Pacific (Taoyuan, Taiwan) defeated  Team East ( Kennett Square), 12–1, in the final.
 August 17 – 27: 2017 Little League World Series in   South Williamsport
  Team Japan (Tokyo Kitasuna LL) defeated  Team Southwest ( Lufkin), 12–2, in the final.

Basketball

FIBA
Africa
 July 13 – 22: 2017 FIBA Africa Under-16 Championship in  Vacoas-Phoenix
  defeated , 76–65, to win their first FIBA Africa Under-16 Championship title.
  took third place.
 August 4 – 12: 2017 FIBA Under-16 Women's African Championship in  Maputo
  defeated , 68–29, to win their fifth consecutive FIBA Under-16 Women's African Championship title.
  took third place.
 August 18 – 27: AfroBasket Women 2017 in  Bamako
  defeated , 65–48, to win their third FIBA AfroBasket Women title.
  took third place.
 September 8 – 16: AfroBasket 2017 in  Tunis and  Dakar
  defeated , 77–65, to win their second AfroBasket title.
  took third place.

Asia
 January 29 – February 2: 2017 WABA Championship in  Amman
 Champions:  (10 points); Second:  (9 points); Third:  (8 points)
 Note: Along with the three teams mentioned above,  and  have qualified to compete in the 2017 FIBA Asia Cup.
 April 19 – 23: 2017 WABA U16 Championship in  Tehran
 Champions:  (8 points); Second:  (7 points); Third:  (6 points)
 May 12 – 18: 2017 SEABA Championship in  Quezon City
 Champions:  (12 points); Second:  (11 points); Third:  (10 points)
 Note: The Philippines have qualified to compete in the 2017 FIBA Asia Cup.
 May 26 – 28: 2017 FIBA 3x3 U18 Asia Cup for Men and Women in  Cyberjaya
 Men -> Champions: ; Second: ; Third: 
 Women -> Champions: ; Second: ; Third: 
 June 3 – 7: 2017 EABA Championship in  Nagano
  defeated , 77–64, to win their first EABA Championship title.  took third place.
 July 23 – 29: 2017 FIBA Women's Asia Cup in  Bangalore
  defeated , 74–73, to win their third consecutive and fourth overall FIBA Women's Asia Cup title.
  took third place.
 August 8 – 20: 2017 FIBA Asia Cup in  Zouk Mosbeh
  defeated , 79–56, to win their first FIBA Asia Cup title.
  took third place.
 September 22 – 30: 2017 FIBA Asia Champions Cup in  Chenzhou
  Al Riyadi defeated  China Kashgar, 88–59, to win their second FIBA Asia Champions Cup title.
  BC Astana took third place.
 October 22 – 28: 2017 FIBA Under-16 Women's Asian Championship in  Bangalore
  defeated , 61–60, to win their first FIBA Under-16 Women's Asian Championship title.
  took third place.
 October 27 – 29: FIBA 3x3 Asia Cup 2017 in  Ulaanbaatar
  defeated , 19–14, in the final.  took third place.

Americas
 June 7 – 11: 2017 FIBA Under-16 Women's Americas Championship in  Buenos Aires
 The  defeated , 91–46, to win their fourth FIBA Under-16 Women's Americas Championship title.
  won the bronze medal.
 Note: All three teams mentioned here, plus , have qualified to compete at the 2018 FIBA Under-17 Women’s Basketball World Cup.
 June 14 – 18: 2017 FIBA Americas Under-16 Championship in  Formosa
 The  defeated , 111–60, to win their fifth consecutive FIBA Americas Under-16 Championship title.
  won the bronze medal.
 July 12 – 16: 2017 Women's Centrobasket Championship in  Saint Thomas, U.S. Virgin Islands
 Champions: ; Second: ; Third: 
 Note: All three teams mentioned here have qualified to compete at the 2017 FIBA Women's AmeriCup.
 July 15 – 21: 2017 FIBA South America Under-17 Championship for Men in  Lima
  defeated , 70–60, to win their first Men's FIBA South America Under-17 Championship title.
  won the bronze medal.
 July 26 – 30: 2017 Under-17 Centrobasket in  Santo Domingo
 The  defeated , 81–80, in the final.  took third place.
 August 7 – 13: 2017 FIBA Women's AmeriCup in  Buenos Aires
  defeated , 67–65, to win their second consecutive and third overall FIBA Women's AmeriCup title.
  won the bronze medal.
 Note: All three teams mentioned above all qualified to compete at the 2018 FIBA Women's Basketball World Cup.
 August 15 – 19: 2017 Women's Under-17 Centrobasket Championship in  Aguada
  defeated , 83–77, in the final.  took third place.
 August 25 – September 3: 2017 FIBA AmeriCup in  Bahía Blanca & Córdoba,  Medellín, and  Montevideo
 The  defeated , 81–76, to win their seventh FIBA AmeriCup title.
  won the bronze medal.

Europe
  defeated , 71–55, to win their third EuroBasket Women title.
  took third place.
 July 7 – 9: 2017 FIBA 3x3 Europe Cup in  Amsterdam
 Men:  defeated , 16–13, in the final.  took third place.
 Women:  defeated , 22–14, in the final. The  took third place.
 July 8 – 16: 2017 FIBA Europe Under-20 Championship for Women in  Matosinhos
  defeated , 73–63, to win their third consecutive and seventh overall FIBA Europe Under-20 Championship for Women title.
  took third place.
 July 15 – 23: 2017 FIBA Europe Under-20 Championship in  Heraklion, Rethymno, & Chania
  defeated , 65–56, to win their third FIBA Europe Under-20 Championship title.
  took third place.
 July 29 – August 6: 2017 FIBA Europe Under-18 Championship in  Bratislava & Piešťany
  defeated , 74–62, to win their third FIBA Europe Under-18 Championship title.
  took third place.
 August 4 – 12: 2017 FIBA Under-16 Women's European Championship in  Bourges
  defeated , 63–55, to win their third FIBA Under-16 Women's European Championship title.
  took third place.
 August 5 – 13: 2017 FIBA Europe Under-18 Championship for Women in  Sopron
  defeated , 55–53, to win their second FIBA Europe Under-18 Championship for Women title.
  took third place.
 August 11 – 19: 2017 FIBA Europe Under-16 Championship in  Podgorica
  defeated , 75–68, to win their third FIBA Europe Under-16 Championship title.
  took third place.
 August 31 – September 17: EuroBasket 2017 in  Istanbul (knockout stages and final),  Cluj-Napoca,  Helsinki and  Tel Aviv
  defeated , 93–85, to win their first EuroBasket title.
  took third place.
 September 1 – 3: 2017 FIBA 3x3 Under-18 Europe Cup in  Debrecen
 Women:  defeated , 12–9, in the final. The  took third place.

Oceania
 July 10 – 15: 2017 FIBA Under-17 Oceania Championship for Men and Women in  Hagåtña, Guam
 Men:  defeated , 93–55, to win their fifth consecutive FIBA Under-17 Oceania Championship title.
  took the bronze medal.
 Women:  defeated , 81–60, to win their fifth consecutive FIBA Under-17 Women's Oceania Championship title.
  took the bronze medal.

World
 June 17 – 21: 2017 FIBA 3x3 World Cup in  Nantes
 Men:  defeated , 21–18, to win their second consecutive and third overall FIBA 3x3 World Cup title.
  took the bronze medal.
 Women:  defeated , 19–12, to win their first Women's FIBA 3x3 World Cup title.
  took the bronze medal.
 June 28 – July 2: 2017 FIBA 3x3 U18 World Cup in  Chengdu
 Men -> Champions: ; Second: ; Third: 
 Women -> Champions: ; Second: ; Third: 
 July 1 – 9: 2017 FIBA Under-19 Basketball World Cup in  Cairo
  defeated , 79–60, to win their first FIBA Under-19 Basketball World Cup title.
 The  took the bronze medal.
 July 22 – 30: 2017 FIBA Under-19 Women's Basketball World Cup in  Udine & Cividale del Friuli
  took the bronze medal.

2017 FIBA 3x3 World Tour
 July 15 & 16: 3x3 WT #1 in  Saskatoon
  Ljubljana defeated  Saskatoon, 21–14, in the final.
 July 29 & 30: 3x3 WT #2 in  Utsunomiya
  Novi Sad al-Wahda defeated  Piran, 17–16, in the final.
 August 5 & 6: 3x3 WT #3 in  Prague
  Novi Sad al-Wahda defeated  Ljubljana, 21–11, in the final.
 August 25 & 26: 3x3 WT #4 in  Lausanne
  Novi Sad al-Wahda defeated  Lausanne, 20–15, in the final.
 August 31 & September 1: 3x3 WT #5 in  Debrecen
  Liman defeated  Ljubljana, 21–14, in the final.
 September 23 & 24: 3x3 WT #6 in  Chengdu
  Piran defeated  Zemun, 19–18, in the final.
 September 30 & October 1: 3x3 WT #7 in  Mexico City
  Liman defeated fellow Serbian team, Zemun, 21–15, in the final.
 October 28 & 29: 3x3 WT #8 (final) in  Beijing
  Zemun defeated  Novi Sad al-Wahda, 19–17, in the final.

National Basketball Association
 October 25, 2016 – April 12, 2017: 2016–17 NBA season
 Top Seed:  Golden State Warriors
 Top Scorer:  Russell Westbrook ( Oklahoma City Thunder)
 February 19: 2017 NBA All-Star Game at the Smoothie King Center in  New Orleans
 The West defeated the East, 192–182.
 MVP:  Anthony Davis ( New Orleans Pelicans)
 NBA All-Star Celebrity Game: Team East defeated Team West, 88–59.
 Rising Stars Challenge: Team World defeated Team USA, 150–141.
 NBA All-Star Weekend Skills Challenge Winner:  Kristaps Porziņģis ( New York Knicks)
 Three-Point Contest Winner:  Eric Gordon ( Houston Rockets)
 Slam Dunk Contest Winner:  Glenn Robinson III ( Indiana Pacers)
 April 15 – June 12: 2017 NBA Playoffs
 The  Golden State Warriors defeated the  Cleveland Cavaliers, 4–1 in games played, to win their fifth NBA title.
 MVP:  Kevin Durant (Golden State Warriors)
 June 22: 2017 NBA draft
 #1 pick:  Markelle Fultz (to the  Philadelphia 76ers from the  Washington Huskies)

Women's National Basketball Association
 April 13: 2017 WNBA draft in  New York City at the Samsung 837
 Top pick:  Kelsey Plum (to the  San Antonio Stars from the  Washington Huskies)
 May 13 – September 3: 2017 WNBA season
 Western Conference winners:  Minnesota Lynx
 Eastern Conference winners:  New York Liberty 
 July 22: 2017 WNBA All-Star Game in  Seattle
 The Western Conference defeated the Eastern Conference, 130–121.
 MVP:  Maya Moore ( Minnesota Lynx)
 Three-Point Shootout winner:  Allie Quigley ( Chicago Sky)
 September 6 – October 4: 2017 WNBA Finals
 The  Minnesota Lynx defeated the  Los Angeles Sparks, 3–2 in games played, to win their fourth WNBA title.

National Collegiate Athletic Association
 March 14 – April 3: 2017 NCAA Division I men's basketball tournament (Final Four at University of Phoenix Stadium in Glendale)
 The  North Carolina Tar Heels defeated the  Gonzaga Bulldogs, 71–65, to win their sixth NCAA Division I men's basketball tournament title.
 March 17 – April 2: 2017 NCAA Division I women's basketball tournament (Final Four at American Airlines Center in Dallas)
 The  South Carolina Gamecocks defeated the  Mississippi State Bulldogs, 67–55, to win their first NCAA Division I women's basketball tournament title.

Club seasons and championships
 September 29, 2016 – April 13: 2016–17 ABA League
  KK Crvena zvezda defeated  KK Cedevita, 3–0 in games played, to win their third consecutive ABA League title. 
 September 29, 2016 – April 24: 2016–17 Alpe Adria Cup
  MBK Rieker Komárno defeated  KK Domžale, 160–139 on aggregate, to win their first Alpe Adria Cup title.
 October 2, 2016 – June 13, 2017: 2016–17 VTB United League
  CSKA Moscow defeated fellow Russian team, BC Khimki, 3–0 in series played, to win their sixth consecutive and eighth overall VTB United League title.
 October 5, 2016 – March 19: 2016–17 WABA League (Final Four in  Podgorica)
  Athlete Celje defeated  Beroe, 61–57, to win their second WABA League title.  Budućnost Bemax took third place.
 October 10, 2016 – April 20: 2016–17 BIBL
  BC Beroe defeated  KK Kumanovo, 161–128 on aggregate, to win their first BIBL title.
 October 12, 2016 – May 21: 2016–17 EuroLeague (Final Four at Sinan Erdem Dome in  Istanbul)
  Fenerbahçe defeated  Olympiacos B.C., 80–64, to win their first EuroLeague title.
  PBC CSKA Moscow took third place.
 October 12, 2016 – April 5: 2016–17 EuroCup Basketball
  Unicaja defeated  Valencia Basket, 2–1, in the EuroCup Finals to win their first EuroCup title.
 October 18, 2016 – April 26: 2016–17 FIBA Europe Cup (final in  Chalon-sur-Saône & Nanterre)
  Nanterre 92 defeated fellow French team, Élan Chalon, 140–137 on aggregate, to win their first FIBA Europe Cup title. 
 October 20, 2016 – April 30: 2016–17 Basketball Champions League (Final Four at the Santiago Martín in  La Laguna) (debut event)
  Iberostar Tenerife defeated  Banvit B.K., 63–59, to win the inaugural Basketball Champions League title.
  Monaco took third place.
 November 25, 2016 – April 23: 2016–17 ABL season
  Eastern Sports Club (basketball) defeated  Singapore Slingers, 3–1 in the finals, to win their first ABL title.
 January 20 – March 18: 2017 FIBA Americas League in  Mexicali and Monterrey,  Buenos Aires, and  Ponce
  Guaros de Lara defeated  Weber Bahía Basket, 88–65, to win their second consecutive FIBA Americas League title. 
  Leones de Ponce took third place.
 September 24: 2017 FIBA Intercontinental Cup in  La Laguna
  Iberostar Tenerife defeated  Guaros de Lara, 76–71, to win their first FIBA Intercontinental Cup title.
 November 10 – 19: 2017 FIBA Africa Women's Clubs Champions Cup in  Luanda
  Primeiro de Agosto defeated  Ferroviário de Maputo, 65–51, to win their third FIBA Africa Women's Clubs Champions Cup title.
  First Bank B.C. took third place.
 December 11 – 20: 2017 FIBA Africa Champions Cup in  Radès
  AS Salé defeated  Étoile Sportive de Radès, 77–69, to win their first FIBA Africa Champions Cup title.
  Union Sportive Monastir took third place.

Beach soccer

Beach tennis

Beach volleyball

Biathlon

Bobsleigh and Skeleton

Bowls

World events
 March 14 – 22: 2017 World Cup in  Warilla
 Men's:  Jeremy Henry defeated  Soufi Rusli 6–5 11–2.
 Women's:  Jo Edwards defeated  Lucy Beere 8–5 2–9 4–1.
 March 27 – April 2: World Junior Cup in  Broadbeach
 Men's:  Daniel Salmon defeated  Corey Wedlock, 21–17.
 Women's:  Pricilla Westlake defeated  Ellen Ryan, 21–20. 
 Mixed Pairs:  Connie Rixon &  Bill Johnson defeated  Claire Walker &  John Fleming, 21–17.
 September 23 – 29: 11th European Bowls Team Championships in  Les Creux
 October 27 – November 5: World Singles Champion of Champions in  St Johns Park

World Bowls Tour
 November 5 – 12, 2016: The Co-op Funeralcare Scottish International Open 2016 in  Perth
  David Gourlay defeated  Jamie Chestney, 2–0 (11–9, 10–6)
 January 12 – 27: 2017 World Indoor Bowls Championship in  Hopton-on-Sea
 Men's:  Paul Foster defeated  Greg Harlow, 2–1 (7–10, 11–1, 2–0).
 Women's:  Katherine Rednall defeated  Ellen Falkner, 2–0 (10–5, 10–6).
 Men's Pairs:  Jason Greenslade &  Les Gillett defeated  Damian Doubler &  Daniel Salmon, 1.5–0.5 (7–7, 8–6).
 Mixed Pairs:  Nick Brett &  Claire Johnston defeated  Paul Foster &  Rebecca Field, 2–1 (7–6, 7–9, 2–1).
 March 5 – 10: The Co-op Funeralcare International Open 2017 in  Blackpool
  Jamie Chestney defeated  Stewart Anderson, 9,4 – 8,6.
 May 4 – 7: The Co-op Funeralcare European Masters 2017 in  Blackpool
  Danny Denison defeated  Simon Skelton, 12–6, 9–7.

Other bowls events
 January 3 – 8: Team USA Trials 2017 in  Las Vegas
 Winners:  Jakob Butturff (m) /  Erin McCarthy
 November 11 – 18: USA Open in  Sarasota, Florida

Canadian football
November 26 – 105th Grey Cup: Toronto Argonauts defeat Calgary Stampeders, 27–24.

Canoeing

Chess

FIDE Grand Prix 2017
February 17 – 28: #1 in  Sharjah
 Winners:  Alexander Grischuk,  Maxime Vachier-Lagrave and  Shakhriyar Mamedyarov
May 11 – 22: #2 in  Moscow
 Winner:  Ding Liren
July 5 – 16: #3 in  Geneva
 Winner:  Teimour Radjabov
November 15 – 26: #4 in  Palma

2017 Grand Chess Tour
 June 19 – 25: Paris Grand Chess Tour in  Paris
 Winner:  Magnus Carlsen, 2nd place:  Maxime Vachier-Lagrave, 3rd place:  Hikaru Nakamura
 June 26 – July 2: Your Next Move Grand Chess Tour in  Leuven
 Blitz winners:  Wesley So, 2nd place:  Maxime Vachier-Lagrave, 3rd place:  Magnus Carlsen
 Rapid winners:  Magnus Carlsen, 2nd place:  Maxime Vachier-Lagrave &  Anish Giri, 3rd place:  Vladimir Kramnik &  Levon Aronian
 Combined Score: 1st:  Magnus Carlsen, 2nd:  Wesley So, 3rd:  Maxime Vachier-Lagrave
 July 31 – August 12: Sinquefield Cup in  St. Louis
 Winner:  Maxime Vachier-Lagrave, 2nd place:  Magnus Carlsen &  Viswanathan Anand, 3rd place:  Levon Aronian &  Sergey Karjakin
 August 13 – 20: Saint Louis Rapid & Blitz in  St. Louis
 November 30 – December 11: London Chess Classic (final) in  London

Major
 December 28, 2016 – January 5, 2017: Hastings International Chess Congress in  Hastings
 Winner:  Deep Sengupta
 January 14 & 15: Paul Keres Memorial Tournament in  Tallinn
 Winner:  Igor Kovalenko
 January 23 – February 2: Gibraltar Chess Festival in 
 Winners:  Hikaru Nakamura (m) /  Ju Wenjun (f)
 February 21 – March 1: Aeroflot Open in  Moscow
 Winner:  Vladimir Fedoseev
 June 5 – 17: Norway Chess in  Stavanger
 Winner:  Levon Aronian, 2nd place:  Hikaru Nakamura, 3rd place:  Vladimir Kramnik
 August 13 – 23: Abu Dhabi Chess Festival in  Abu Dhabi

World events
 February 10 – March 5: Women's World Chess Championship 2017 in  Tehran
 Winner:  Tan Zhongyi
 April 1 – 9: World Amateur Chess Championship in  Spoleto
 U2300 Open winner:  Tun Win
 U2000 winners:  Maciej Koziej (m) /  Zainab Saumy (f)
 U1700 winners:  Hope Mkhumba (m) /  Vilena Popova (f)
 Blitz tournament #1 winner:  Ruslan Pahomov
 Blitz tournament #2 winner:  Daniel King-wai Lam
 April 21 – 30: World Schools Chess Championship in  Iași
 U7 winners:  Khumoyun Begmuratov (m) /  Tselmuun Dorjsuren (f)
 U9 winners:  Erdenebat Azjargal (m) /  Afruza Khamdamova (f)
 U11 winners:  Efe Hakan Öztürk (m) /  Martyna Starosta (f)
 U13 winners:  Enes Tanrıverdi (m) /  Nazerke Nurgali (f)
 U15 winners:  Nodirbek Yakubboev (m) /  Assel Serikbay (f)
 U17 winners:  Andrei Macovei (m) /  Diana Mîrza (f)
 April 24 – May 4: World Team Chess Championship 50+, 65+ in  Crete
 +50 winners: 1st:  Saint Petersburg, 2nd: , 3rd:  I
 +65 winners: 1st: , 2nd: , 3rd:  I
 June 1 – 5: 1st FIDE World Cadets Rapid & Blitz Chess Championships 2017 in  Minsk
 Rapid U8 winners:  Phạm Trần Gia Phúc (m) /  Sofia Mutina (f)
 Blitz U8 winners:  Andrei Rudnev (m) /  Anna Shukhman (f)
 Rapid U10 winners:  Mikhei Navumenka (m) /  Veronika Shubenkova (f)
 Blitz U10 winners:  Islombek Sindarov (m) /  Veronika Shubenkova (f)
 Rapid U12 winners:  Volodar Murzin (m) /  Anastasiia Dubovyk (f)
 Blitz U12 winners:  Denis Lazavik (m) /  Kseniya Zeliantsova (f)
 June 17 – 26: World Team Chess Championship in  Khanty-Mansiysk
 Winners:  (Ding Liren, Yu Yangyi, Wei Yi, Li Chao, Wen Yang (m) /  (Alexandra Kosteniuk, Kateryna Lagno, Valentina Gunina, Aleksandra Goryachkina, Olga Girya)
 June 22 – 29: 1st FIDE World Junior Chess Championship for the Disabled in  Orlando
 Winner:  Raphael Johannes Zimmer, 2nd place:  Samarth Jagadish Rao, 3rd place:  Griffin McConnell
August 21 – 31: World Cadet Chess Championship in  Brasília
September 1 – 25: Chess World Cup 2017 in  Batumi and Tbilisi
September 16 – 26: World Youth Chess Championship (U-14, 16, 18) in  Montevideo
October 1 – 16: World Junior Chess Championship in  Tarvisio
November 6 – 19: World Senior Chess Championship in  Acqui Terme
TBD: World Youth U-16 Chess Olympiad 2017 in  Ahmedabad

European events
 April 10 – 23: Women's European Individual Chess Championship 2017 in  Riga
 Winner:  Nana Dzagnidze
 Note: Nana Dzagnidze,  Kateryna Lagno,  Mariya Muzychuk,  Monika Soćko,  Elina Danielian,  Elisabeth Pähtz,  Marina Nechaeva,  Bela Khotenashvili,  Natalia Zhukova,  Natalia Pogonina,  Hoang Thanh Trang and  Anita Gara qualified for Chess World Cup.
 May 29 – June 10: European Individual Chess Championship in  Minsk
 Winner:  Maxim Matlakov
 Note: Maxim Matlakov,  Baadur Jobava,  Vladimir Fedoseev,  Daniel Fridman,  Ivan Cheparinov,  Alexander Motylev,  Jan-Krzysztof Duda,  David Navara,  David Howell,  Martyn Kravtsiv,  Alexander Areshchenko, and  Matthias Blübaum qualified for Chess World Cup.
 June 9 – 17: European Amateur Chess Championship 2017 in  Niš
 Elo 2000–2299 winner:  Diyap Buyukasik
 Elo 1700–1999 winner:  Doruk Karaoğlan
 Elo 0–1699 winner:  Pavle Ćirić
 June 10 – 20: European Schools Championship 2017 in  Budva
 U7 winners:  Timur Yonal (m) /  Ekaterina Zubkovskaya (f)
 U9 winners:  Kerem Erten (m) /  Elif Zeren Yıldız (f)
 U11 winners:  Zeki Berke Çaputçuoğlu (m) /  Evita Cherepanova (f)
 U13 winners:  Maksim Zhukov (m) /  Esma Doğa Duran (f)
 U15 winners:  Nikoloz Petriashvili (m) /  Michelle Katkov (f)
 U17 winners:  Timur Trubchaninov (m) /  Bengu Sena Ayan (f)
 June 19 – 23: European Youth Rapid and Blitz Championship 2017 in  Budva
 Rapid U8 winners:  Savely Morozov (m) /  Ekaterina Zubkovskaya (f)
 Rapid U10 winners:  Daniil Maneluk (m) /  Galina Mikheeva (f)
 Rapid U12 winners:  Daniel Dardha (m) /  Evita Cherepanova (f)
 Rapid U14 winners:  Jan Šubelj (m) /  Ksenia Strukova (f)
 Rapid U16 winners:  Viachaslau Zarubitski (m) /  Viktoria Radeva (f)
 Rapid U18 winners:  Florian Mesaros (m) /  Ivana Hrescak (f)
 Blitz U10 winners:  Daniil Maneluk (m) /  Evelina Zavivaeva (f)
 Blitz U14 winners:  Jan Šubelj (m) /  Klean Shuqja (f)
 Blitz U18 winners:  Florian Mesaros (m) /  Olga Badelka (f)
 June 24 – July 4: European Team Chess Championship for seniors in  Novi Sad
 +50 winners:  (Miloš Pavlović, Goran Todorović, Siniša Dražić, Zoran Arsovic, Nenad Ristić)
 +65 winners:  (Evgeny Sveshnikov, Yuri Balashov, Evgeni Vasiukov, Vladimir Zhelnin, Nikolai Pushkov)
 August 11 – 21: European Senior Chess Championship in  Barcelona
 August 16 – 24: European Youth Team Chess Championship 2017 in  Iwonicz-Zdrój
 August 18 – 27: EU Youth Chess Championship U8-14 in  Kouty nad Desnou
 September 3 – 14: European Youth Chess Championship in  Mamaia
 September 18 – 22: European Universities Chess Championship 2017 in  Fuengirola
 October 2 – 10: European Chess Club Cup for men and women in  Manavgat
 October 15 – 20: European Youth Rapid and Blitz Championship 2017 in  Budva
 October 20 – 24: European Women's Rapid & Blitz Championship 2017 in 
 October 25 – November 5: European Team Chess Championship in  Halkidiki
 November 11 – 19: 5th European Small Nations Team Chess Championship 2017 in 
 November 24 & 25: 1st European Corporate Chess Championship 2017 in  Paris
 December 14 – 18: European Rapid and Blitz Championship 2017 in  Katowice

2017–18 European Youth Grand Prix
 May 17 – 29, 2017: European Youth Grand Prix #1 in  Kirishi
 Winners: 1st:  Kirill Shubin, 2nd:  Sergei Lobanov, 3rd:  Aram Hakobyan 
 TBD from October, 2017: European Youth Grand Prix #2 in  Jermuk
 TBD from May, 2018: European Youth Grand Prix #3 in  Kirishi

African Events
 July 1 – 13: African Chess Championship (individual, rapid, blitz) in  Oran
 Winners:  Bassem Amin (m) /  Shahenda Wafa (f)
 Blitz winners:  Ahmed Adly (m) /  Shrook Wafa (f)
 Rapid winners:  Bassem Amin (m) /  Shahenda Wafa (f)
 July 23 – August 1: African Club Chess Championships in  Cairo
 Winner Club:  Al Hawar Chess Club
 August 5 – 13: African Women's Chess Challenge in  Gaborone
 August 19 – 27: African Schools Individual Chess Championships in  Windhoek
 October 7 – 15: African Amateur Individual Chess Championships in  Dar es Salaam
 November 11 – 19: African Team Chess Championships in  Tunis
 December 1 – 10: African Youth Chess Championships in  Giza
 December 28, 2017 – January 8, 2018: African Junior Chess Championships 2017 in  Lomé

African Zonals
 March 25 – April 3: Zone 4.2 Individual Championships in  Jimma
 Winners:  Essam El-Gindy (m) /  Shahenda Wafa (f)
 April 1 – 10: Zone 4.1 Individual Championships in  Algiers
 Winners:  Mohamed Haddouche (m) /  Amina Mezioud (f)
 April 20 – 30: Zone 4.4 Individual Championships in  Monrovia (men's only)
 Winner:  Oluwafemi Balogun
 June 9 – 18: Zone 4.3 Individual Championships in  Livingstone
 Winners:  Kenny Solomon (m) /  Aleida De Bruyn (f)

American Events
 April 13 – 18: 2017 CARIFTA Games in  Kingston
 U12 winners:  David Thomas (m) /  Johmoi Blake (f)
 U16 winners:  Alan-Safar Ramoutar (m) /  Adani Clarke (f)
 U20 winners:  Orlando Husbands (m) /  Sheanel Gardner (f)
 April 25 – 30: 2017 South American Junior U20 Championship in  Manta
 Winners:  José Martínez Alcántara (m) /  Anahí Ortiz Verdesoto (f)
 June 9 – 19: Pan American Chess Championship in  Medellín
 Winner:  Samuel Sevian
 Note: Samuel Sevian,  Jorge Cori,  Neuris Delgado Ramírez,  Axel Bachmann,  Emilio Córdova Daza,  Lazaro Bruzon qualified for Chess World Cup 2017.
 June 21 – 28: Central American & Caribbean Junior U20 Chess Championships 2017 in 
  Dondre Husbands
 June 30 – July 7: Panamerican Youth Championship 2017 in 
 U8 winners:  Santiago Lopez Rayo (b) /  Omya Vidyarthi (f)
 Blitz U8 winner:  Santiago Lopez Rayo (b) /  Omya Vidyarthi (f)
 U10 winners:  Eric Li (b) /  Fiorella Contreras (f)
 Blitz U10 winners:  Manuel Campos Gomez (b) /  Fiorella Contreras (f)
 U12 winners:  Nico Werner Chasin (b) /  Vicmary C. Perez Hernandez (f)
 Blitz U12 winners:  Diego Saul Rod Flores Quillas (b) /  Nastassja A Matus (f)
 U14 winners:  Aristo S. Liu (b) /  Emma He (f)
 Blitz U14 winners:  Miguel Angel Soto (b) / /  Aasa Dommalapati (f)
 U16 winners:  Francisco Varacalli (b) /  Javiera Belen Gomez Barrera (f)
 Blitz U16 winners:  Mauricio Ramirez Gonzalez (b) /  Aleyla Hilario (f)
 U18 winners:  Michael Song (b) /  Trilce Cosme Contreras (f)
 Blitz U18 winners:  Jose Gabriel Cardoso Cardoso (b) /  Valentina Argote Heredia (f)
 July 12 – 17: North American Youth Championship 2017 in  Morristown, New Jersey
 U8 winners:  Kevin Duong (b) /  Iris Mou (f)
 U10 winners:  Liran Zhou (b) /  Stephanie Velea (f)
 U12 winners:  Maximillian Lu (b) /  Annapoorni Meiyappan (f)
 U14 winners:  Qiuyu Huang (b) /  Ellen Wang (f)
 U16 winners:  Christopher Yoo (b) /  Queena Deng (f)
 U18 winners:  Bryce Tiglon (b) /  Vicki Yang (f)
 August 9 – 15: Central American & Caribbean Youth Chess Championships 2017 in 
 Men's U8 winner:  Sebastían Mérida Ceballos
 U10 winners:  Yaset Jose Cruz Santos (m) /  Ania Nahid Rosales Espinoza (f)
 U12 winners:  Jean Marco Cruz Mendez (m) /  Andrea Albor Rebolledo (f)
 U14 winners:  Jerzy Jesus Perez Leiva (m) /  Penelope Gonzalez Diaz (f)
 U16 winners:  Raynner Amaro Alfonso (m) /  Roxangel Obregón García (f)
 U18 winners:  Luis Ernesto Quesada Pérez (m) /  Chrissye L Gonzalez Estrada (f)
 August 30 – September 4: North American Junior U20 Championship 2017 in  Dallas
 October 11 – 16: Panamerican Senior Chess Championship 2017 in 
 October 31 – November 7: Panamerican Junior U20 Chess Championship 2017 in  San Salvador
 December 1 – 7: South American Youth Championship 2017 in 
 December 11 – 18: 2017 Panamerican Schools Chess Championship 2017 in  San Salvador
TBD: Panamerican Amateur Chess Championship 2017 in 
TBD: Women's Continental Championship 2017 in 
TBD: Panamerican University Championship 2017 in  Durango
TBD: Panamerican Teams Championship in TBD location

American Zonals
 March 27 – April 11: American Zonal 2.1 Open & Women in  St. Louis
 Winners:  Wesley So (m) /  Sabina-Francesca Foisor (f)
 April 26 – May 1: American Zonal 2.4 in  Florianópolis (men's only)
 Winner:  Jorge Cori 
 April 30 – May 8: American Zonal 2.5 Open in  Buenos Aires (men's only)
 Winner:  Sandro Mareco
 May 26 – 31: American Zonal 2.3 in  San Salvador (men's only)
 Winners:  Joshua Ruiz and  Yuri Gonzalez Vidal 

Asian Events
 March 31 – April 9: Asian Youth Chess Championship in  Tashkent
 U8 winners:  Trần Gia Phúc Phạm (b) /  Afruza Khamdamova (f)
 Blitz U8 winners:  Ilamparthi A R (b) /  Yining Chen (f)
 Rapid U8 winners:  Ilamparthi A R (b) /  Yining Chen (f)
 U10 winners:  Artin Ashraf (b) /  Sahithi Varshini M (f)
 Blitz U10 winners:  Islombek Sindarov (b) /  Sahithi Varshini M (f)
 Rapid U10 winners:  Artin Ashraf (b) /  Yaqing Wei (f)
 U12 winners:  Javokhir Sindarov (b) /  Meruert Kamalidenova (f)
 Blitz U12 winners:  Javokhir Sindarov (b) /  Divya Deshmukh (f)
 Rapid U12 winners:  Nguyễn Quốc Hy (b) /  Meruert Kamalidenova (f)
 U14 winners:  Arjun Erigaisi (b) /  Jishitha D (f)
 Blitz U14 winners:  Arash Daghli (b) / /  Jishitha D (f)
 Rapid U14 winners:  Arjun Erigaisi (b) /  Motahare Asadi (f)
 U16 winners:  Nodirbek Yakubboev (b) /  Assel Serikbay (f)
 Blitz U16 winners:  Mahdi Gholami Orimi (b) /  Assel Serikbay (f)
 Rapid U16 winners:  Shamsiddin Vokhidov (b) /  Assel Serikbay (f)
 U18 winners:  Arash Tahbaz (b) /  Aakanksha Hagawane (f)
 Blitz U18 winners:  Arash Tahbaz (b) /  Aakanksha Hagawane (f)
 Rapid U18 winners:  Ortik Nigmatov (b) /  Gulrukhbegim Tokhirjonova (f)
 May 1 – 10: Asian Juniors and Girls U20 Championships in  Shiraz
 Winners:  Masoud Mosadeghpour (m) /  Ivana Maria Furtado (f)
 Blitz winners:  Trần Tuấn Minh (m) /  Mobina Alinasab (f)
 Rapid winners:  Trần Tuấn Minh (m) /  Isha Sharma (f)
 May 11 – 12: Asian Chess Championship (individual and blitz) in  Chengdu
 Winners:  Wang Hao (m) /  Võ Thị Kim Phụng (f)
 Blitz winners:  R. Vaishali (m) /  Wei Yi (f)
 June 2 – 10: 1st Asian Championship for Disabled in  Bishkek
 June 17 – 26: Eastern Asia Youth Chess Championship 2017 in  Ulanbaatar
  won the gold medal tally and the overall medal tally.
 July 20 – 30: Asian Schools Chess Championship (individual, rapid and blitz) in  Panjin
 Open & girls overall winners: 
 August 1 – 7: Western Asia Youth Chess Championship 2017 in 
 August 1 – 8: Asian Club Cup Championship 2017 in 
 Winners:  Saipa Chess Club, 2nd:  Saif Sporting Chess Club, 3rd place:  Sydney Chess Club
 October 9 – 15: Asian Senior Chess Championship in  Auckland

Asian Zonals
 January 14 – 20: Asian Zonal 3.6 in  Auckland
 Winners:  Anton Smirnov (m) /  Layla Timergazi (f)
 February 24 – March 6: Asian Zonal 3.3 in  Tagaytay
 Winners:  Li Tian Yeoh (m) /  Võ Thị Kim Phụng (f)
 March 18 – 25: Asian Zonal 3.2 in  Pokhara
 Winners:  Abdullah Al Rakib (m) /  Rani Hamid (f)
 June 15 – 25: Asian Zonal 3.4 in  Tashkent
 Winners:  Jahongir Vakhidov (m) /  Dinara Saduakassova (f)

Cricket

Major leagues and cups
 October 6, 2016 – January 14:  2016–17 Ranji Trophy 
 Gujarat defeated Mumbai, 328–228.
 Gujarat won by 5 wickets. 
 October 25, 2016 – March 29:  2016–17 Sheffield Shield season
 Match drawn;  won the competition with first-innings lead.
 February 17 – April 2:  2016–17 Momentum One Day Cup
 Titans defeated Warriors, 425/5–189.
 Titans won by 236 runs.
 April 5 – May 21:  2017 Indian Premier League
 Mumbai Indians defeated Rising Pune Supergiant, 129/8–128/6.
 Mumbai Indians won by 1 run.
 April 7 – September 28: / 2017 County Championship
 Essex won league.
 September 27 – October 21:  2017-18 JLT One-Day Cup
  defeated , 4/250–9/248
  won by 6 wickets.

International cricket competitions
November 11, 2016 – April 18: 2016–17 Regional Four Day Competition
 won round-robin.
January 24 – February 18: 2016–17 Regional Super50 in 
  Barbados Tridents defeated  Jamaica Tallawahs, 271–212.
 Barbados Tridents won by 59 runs.
May 12 – 24: 2017 Ireland Tri-Nation Series in 
 won round robin.
May 21 – 31: 2017 ICC World Cricket League Division Three in 
 and  promoted.
No result in final.
  defeated , 338/4–158.
 Pakistan won by 180 runs.
June 26 – July 23: 2017 Women's Cricket World Cup in 
  defeated  228/7– 219.
 England Women won by 9 runs.
December 2017 (final round): 2015–17 ICC Intercontinental Cup
December 2017 (final round): 2015–17 ICC World Cricket League Championship

2017–18 Ashes series
November 23 – 27: 1st Test at  The Gabba, Brisbane
December 2 – 6: 2nd Test at  Adelaide Oval, Adelaide
December 14 – 18: 3rd Test at  WACA Ground, Perth
December 26 – 30: 4th Test at  Melbourne Cricket Ground, Melbourne
January 4 – 8, 2018: 5th Test at  Sydney Cricket Ground, Sydney

Cross-country skiing

Cue sports

WPA

World 8 Ball Series
 January 14 – 17: Molinari Players' Championship & Cheqio Challenge Championship in  New York City
 Winner:  Ruslan Chinachov
 Challenge winner:  Francisco Sánchez Ruíz
 April 4 – 7: Aramith Masters Championship & Kamui Challenge Championship in  New York City
 Winner:  Eklent Kaçi
 Challenge winner:  Lee Vann Corteza
 July 12 – 15: Ryo Rack Classic Championship & Simonis Challenge Championship in  New York City
 Winner:  Skyler Woodward 
 Challenge winner:  Mika Immonen
 September 27 – October 1: Predator World Series Championship & Highrock Challenge Championship in

Events
 January 10 – 15: 2017 Joy Billiards World Chinese 8 Ball Masters in  Qinhuangdao
 Winner:  Gareth Potts
 January 31 – February 5: IPA World Professional Pool Championships in  Bradford
 Winners:  Craig Marsh (m) /  Collette Henrikson (f)
 February 17 – 19: World Pool Masters in 
  David Alcaide defeated  Jayson Shaw, 8–7, in the final.
 February 26 – March 5: Amway eSpring International Women 9-Ball Championship in  Taipei
 Winner:  Siming CHEN
 March 13 – 16: Chinese 8-Ball World Championship 2017 in  Yushan
 Winners:  Yang Fan (m) /  Xiao Fang Fu (f)
 March 18 – 28: European Pool Championships in  Vale do Lobo
  Niels Feijen defeated  Tomasz Kapłan, 125–13.  Kim Laaksonen and  Mieszko Fortuński take third and fourth places.
 July 31 – August 7: Youth European Championships in  Heeze-Leende
 8 balls winners:  Fedor Gorst (m) /  Kristina Tkach (f)
 9 balls winners:  Jan van Lierop (m) /  Kristina Tkach (f)
 10 balls winners:  Patrick Hofmann (m) /  Kristina Tkach (f)
 Juniors Straight winner:  Kevin Schiller
 Teams winners:  (Patrick Hofmann, Leon Kohl, Kevin Schiller)
 August 14 – 21: European Championships (Seniors & Ladies) in  Heeze-Leende
 8 balls winners:  Henrique Correia (m) /  Susanne Wessel (f)
 9 balls winners:  Henrique Correia (m) /  Ine Helvik (f)
 10 balls winners:  Vegar Kristiansen (m) /  Ine Helvik (f)
 Straight Seniors winner:  Jesse Thehu
 Teams winners:  (m) /  (f)
 August 23 – 26: Dynamic European Championships (U23) in  Heeze-Leende
 8 balls winner:  Joshua Filler
 9 balls winner:  Joshua Filler
 August 17 – 20: 9-Ball World Championship (Wheelchair) in  Tampere
 Winners:  5th Street Players, 2nd place:  The Contenders II, 3rd place:  Here We Go Again &  9-Ball Bombers
 October 30, 2017 – 2 November 2017: 2017 WPA World Nine-ball Junior Championship
 Winners: Sanjin Pehlivanovic (U17), Fedor Gorst (boys), Kristina Tkatsch (girls)
 December 4 – 7: 2017 Mosconi Cup in  Las Vegas
 Winner:  Europe

Euro Tour
 February 23 – 26: 2017 Italian Open in  Treviso
 Winners:  Ralf Souquet (m) /  Ina Kaplan (f)
 March 30 – April 1: 2017 Portugal Open in  Albufeira
 Winners:  Nick van den Berg (m) /  Jasmin Ouschan (f)
 May 18 – 21: 2017 Austrian Open in  St. Johann im Pongau
 Winners:  Mario He (m) /  Jasmin Ouschan (f)
 August 10 – 13: 2017 Dutch Open in  Heeze-Leende
 Winners:  Ruslan Chinachov (m) /  Marharyta Fefilava (f)
 October 5 – 8: 2017 Klagenfurt Open in  Klagenfurt
 Winners:  Ralf Souquet (m) /  Siming Chen (f)
 November 16 – 18: 2017 Treviso Open in  Treviso
 Winner:  Wiktor Zielinski (m)
 November 18 – 19: Women 9-Ball Open in  Braga
 Winner:  Marharyta Fefilava (f)

UMB
 March 4: World Super Cup in  Antwerp
 Winner:  Daniel Sánchez
 March 9 – 12: World Championship for National Teams in  Viersen
 Winners:  (Sung Won Choi & Jae Guen Kim)
 April 7 – 9: Coupe d'Europe Classic Teams (final) in  Prague
 Winners:  Bochum (Sam van Etten, Thomas Nockemann, Ludger Havlik)
 April 28 – May 7: 2017 CEB European Three-cushion Championship in  Brandenburg an der Havel
 Winners: , Second place: , Third place: 
 May 10 & 11: Billiard Charity Challenge in  Halle and Zoersel
 May 12 – 14: UMB World Three-cushion Championship for women in  Halle and Zoersel
 Winner:  Orie Hida, Second place:  Mi Rae Lee, Third place:  Gülşen Degener
 June 8 – 11: Coupe d´Europe Three Cushion Club (final) in  Porto
 Winners:  FC Porto (Dani Sánchez, Torbjörn Blomdahl, Manuel Rui Costa, João Pedro Ferreira)
 June 16 – 18: European Ladies Cup Three Cushion in 
 Winners:  Therese Klompenhouwer, Free Game winner:  Karolien Matthys
 September 15 – 17: World Championship 3 Cushion Juniors in  Los Alcázares
 October 7 – 14: World Championship Five-pin in  Necochea
 November 8 – 12: UMB World Three-cushion Championship in  Santa Cruz
 November 17 – 19: Lausanne Billiard Masters in

Three-Cushion World Cup
 February 6 – 12: World Cup #1 in  Bursa
 Winner:  Frédéric Caudron
 March 26 – April 1: World Cup #2 in  Luxor
 Winner:  Daniel Sánchez
 May 22 – 28: World Cup #3 in  Ho Chi Minh City
 Winner:  Eddy Merckx
 September 3 – 9: World Cup #4 in  Porto
 December 3 – 9: World Cup #5 in  Hurghada

Curling

Cycle ball

Cycling – BMX

Cycling – Cyclo-cross

Cycling – Mountain Bike

Cycling – Para-cycling

Cycling – Road

Cycling – Track

Cycling – Trials

Dancesport

WDSF Super Grand Prix
 March 12: #1  Super Grand Prix (PD) Tokyo
 Winners:  Benedetto Ferruggia & Claudia Köhler
 2nd place:  Donatas Vėželis & Lina Chatkevičiūtė
 3rd place:  Marco Camarlinghi & Martina Minasi
 April 15 & 16: #2  Super Grand Prix Cambrils
 Latin winners:  Pavel Pasechnik & Marta Arndt
 Standard winners:  Benedetto Ferruggia & Claudia Köhler
 August 8 – 10: #3  Super Grand Prix (PD) Stuttgart
 Latin winners:  Marts Smolko & Tina Bazykina
 September 30: #4  Super Grand Prix Ostrava
 December 3: #5  WDSF PD Super Grand Prix Moscow

WDSF World Cup
 March 4: WDSF PD World Cup in  Kharkiv (Standard only)
 Winners:  Benedetto Ferruggia & Claudia Köhler
 Second place:  Donatas Vėželis & Lina Chatkevičiūtė
 Third place:  Marco Cavallaro & Letizia Ingrosso
 June 3: WDSF World Cup in  Szombathely (Latin only)
 1st place:  Andrea Silvestri & Martina Váradi
 Second place:  Timur Yusupov & Sofia Kharina
 Third place:  Giacomo Lazzarini & Roberta Benedetti
 June 24: WDSF PD World Cup in  Baden-Baden (Latin only)
 1st place:  Marts Smolko & Tina Bazykina
 Second place:  Daniele Sargenti & Uliana Fomenko
 Third place:  Wang Jun & Jia Yiwen
 August 26: WDSF World Cup (Standard) in  Johor Bahru
 Winners:  Francesco Galuppo & Debora Pacini
 Second place:  Vasily Kirin & Ekaterina Prozorova
 Third place:  Evgeny Nikitin & Anastasia Miliutina
 December 9: WDSF World Cup in  Ashdod

WDSF GrandSlam
 March 18 & 19: #1  GrandSlam Helsinki
 Adult Standard winners:  Dmitry Zharkov & Olga Kulikova
 Adult Latin winners:  Gabriele Goffredo & Anna Matus
 April 8 & 9: #2  GrandSlam Wuhan
 Adult Standard winners:  Dmitry Zharkov & Olga Kulikova
 Adult Latin winners:  Gabriele Goffredo & Anna Matus
 July 8 & 9: #3  GrandSlam Hong Kong
 Adult Standard winners:  Dmitry Zharkov & Olga Kulikova
 Adult Latin winners:  Gabriele Goffredo & Anna Matus
 August 10 – 12: #4  GrandSlam Stuttgart
 Adult Standard winners:  Dmitry Zharkov & Olga Kulikova
 Adult Latin winners:  Gabriele Goffredo & Anna Matus
 October 27 & 28: #5  GrandSlam Moscow
 December 9 & 10: #6 (final)  GrandSlam Shanghai

WDSF World Open
 January 7 & 8: #1  World Open Madrid
 World Open Standard Adult winners:  Evaldas Sodeika &  Ieva Žukauskaitė
 World Open Latin Adult winners:  Marius-Andrei Bălan &  Khrystyna Moshenska
 January 28: #2  World Open Pforzheim
 World Open Latin Adult winners:  Marius-Andrei Bălan &  Khrystyna Moshenska
 February 11 & 12: #3  World Open Antwerp
 World Open Standard Adult winners:  Dmitry Zharkov &  Olga Kulikova
 World Open Latin Adult winners:  Anton Aldaev &  Natalia Polukhina
 February 17 & 18: #4  World Open Copenhagen
 World Open Standard Adult winners:  Anton Skuratov & Alona Uehlin
 World Open Latin Adult winners:  Guillem Pascual and Rosa Carné
 February 25 & 26: #5  World Open Moscow
 World Open Standard Adult winners:  Evgeny Nikitin & Anastasia Miliutina
 World Open Latin Adult winners:  Armen Tsaturyan & Svetlana Gudyno
 March 11 & 12: #6  World Open Bucharest
 World Open Standard Adult winners:  Madis Abel & Aleksandra Galkina
 World Open Latin Adult winners:  Armen Tsaturyan & Svetlana Gudyno
 March 12: #7  World Open Tokyo
 World Open Standard Adult winners:  Sean Aranar & Ana Nualla
 World Open Latin Adult winners:  Lim Tan Hong & Choi Ju Young
 March 25 & 26: #8  World Open Minsk
 World Open Standard Adult winners:  Alexey Glukhov & Anastasia Glazunova
 World Open Latin Adult winners:  Timur Imametdinov & Nina Bezzubova
 March 25 & 26: #9  World Open Pieve di Cento
 World Open Standard Adult winners:  Dmitry Zharkov &  Olga Kulikova
 World Open Latin Adult winners:  Gabriele Goffredo & Anna Matus
 April 2: #10  World Open Brno
 World Open Standard Adult winners:  Bjørn Bitsch & Ashli Williamson
 April 22 & 23: #11  World Open Uzhhorod
 World Open Standard Adult winners:  Dumitru Doga & Sarah Ertmer
 World Open Latin Adult winners:  Marek Bures & Anastasiia Iermolenko
 May 13: #12  World Open Varna
 World Open Latin Adult winners:  Giacomo Lazzarini & Roberta Benedetti
 May 14: #13  World Open Tbilisi
 World Open Latin Adult winners:  Edgar Marcos & Alina Nowak
 May 20: #14  World Open Paredes
 World Open Latin Adult winners:  Edgar Marcos & Alina Nowak
 July 2: #15  World Open Batumi
 World Open Latin Adult winners:  Giacomo Lazzarini & Roberta Benedetti
 July 22 & 23: #16  World Open Wuppertal
 World Open Standard Adult winners:  Anton Skuratov & Alena Uehlin
 World Open Latin Adult winners:  Marius-Andrei Bălan & Khrystyna Moshenska
 August 19 & 20: #17  World Open Tallinn
 World Open Standard Adult winners:  Ergo Lükk & Baile Orb
 World Open Latin Adult winners:  Giacomo Lazzarini & Roberta Benedetti
 September 2 & 3: #18  World Open Bangkok
 World Open Standard Adult winners:  Dmitry Zharkov & Olga Kulikova
 World Open Latin Adult winners:  Marius-Andrei Bălan & Khrystyna Moshenska
 September 9 & 10: #19  World Open Bratislava
 September 16 & 17: #20  World Open Prague
 September 16 & 17: #21  World Open Sibiu
 September 24: #22  World Open Bertrange
 September 23: #23  World Open Lisbon
 September 23 & 24: #24  World Open Zagreb
 September 30 – October 1: #25  World Open Belgrade
 September 30: #26  World Open Ostrava
 October 7 & 8: #27  World Open Moscow
 October 14 & 15: #28  World Open Elbląg
 October 21: #29  World Open Almere
 November 4: #30  World Open Riga
 November 5: #31  World Open Ankara
 November 11 & 12: #32  World Open Warsaw
 November 18 & 19: #33  World Open Vienna
 November 25: #34  World Open Tallinn
 December 2 & 3: #35  World Open Maribor
 December 3: #36  World Open Vilnius
 December 16: #37 (final)  World Open Riga

International events
 February 10: WDSF World Championship (Standard Senior II) in  Antwerp
 Winners:  Pierre Payen & Isabelle Reyjal
 2nd place:  Gert Faustmann & Alexandra Kley
 3rd place:  Alberto Belometti & Barbara Pini
 February 18: WDSF European Ten Dance Championship in  Copenhagen
 Winners:  Dumitru Doga & Sarah Ertmer
 2nd place:  Nikolaj Lund & Marta Kocik
 3rd place:  Kirill Medianov & Elisaveta Semjonova
 February 25: WDSF World Championship (U21 Latin) in  Bassano del Grappa
 Winners:  Vladislav Kolesnikov & Naja Dolenc
 2nd place:  Bartosz Lewandowski & Anna Walachowska
 3rd place:  Raffaello Brancato & Amandine Van Biesbroeck
 March 23: WDSF World Championship (Standard IV) in  Pieve di Cento
 Winners:  Luciano Ceruti & Rosa Nuccia Cappello
 2nd place:  Alessandro Barbone & Patrizia Flamini
 3rd place:  Nicholas Nero & Anna Maria Arzenton
 April 1 & 2: DSE European Children Grand Prix in  Brno
 Junior I winners:  Sergey Burdin & Anastasia Sitnikova (Standard);  Georgy Gudovsky & Kamilla Shaymiardianova (Latin)
 Junior II winners:  Aleksey Bessonov & Evgenia Kolmagorova (Standard);  Hubert Raczek & Magdalena Kowalska (Latin)
 Juvenile I winners:  Dragoș Josan & Alexandra Bezniuc (Standard & Latin)   
 Juvenile II winners:  Mateusz Stawowy & Sara Silva (Standard & Latin)
 April 1 & 2: DSE European Universities Championship in  Brno
 Adult Standard winners:  Kamil Kedra & Aleksandra Fron
 Adult Latin winners:  Jakub Richtár & Klára Petrušková
 April 9: WDSF PD World Championship (Show Dance Latin) in  Vienna
 Winners:  Vadim Garbuzov & Kathrin Menzinger
 2nd place:  Mikhail Shchepkin & Anna Baklanova
 3rd place:  Marco Zingarelli & Ilaria Campana
 April 15: WDSF European Championship (Latin) in  Cambrils
 Winners:  Armen Tsaturyan & Svetlana Gudyno
 Second place:  Gabriele Goffredo & Anna Matus
 Third place:  Marius-Andrei Balan & Khrystyna Moshenska
 April 16: DSE European Championship of National Teams in  Cambrils
 U21 winners:  (Latin and Standard)
 Adults winners:  (Standard),  (Latin)
 Senior I winners:  (Standard),  (Latin)
 Overall winners:  (93 points)
 May 13: WDSF World Championship (U21) in  Salaspils
 Winners:  Denis Gudovsky & Megija Dana Morīte
 Second place:  Paul Rednic şi Roxana Lucaciu
 Third place:  Mateusz Brzozowski & Justyna Możdżonek
 May 14: WDSF European Championship (Youth Latin) in  Chișinău
 Winners:  Daniil Porcesco-Gozun și Anastasia Grunzu
 Second place:  Coman Eduard Florentin & Tudorache Irina Elena
 Third place:  Nikita Olinichenko & Elizaveta Pustornakova
 May 14: WDSF PD European Cup in  Debrecen (Latin only)
 Winners:  Daniele Sargenti & Uliana Fomenko
 Second place:  Marts Smolko & Tina Bazykina
 Third place:  Alexandr Makarov & Anzhela Kuryshova
 May 14: WDSF PD European Championship in  Debrecen (Standard only)
 Winners:  Benedetto Ferruggia & Claudia Köhler
 Second place:  Donatas Vėželis & Lina Chatkevičiūtė
 Third place:  László Csaba & Viktória Páli
 May 19: WDSF European Championship (standard) in  Olomouc
 Winners:  Dmitry Zharkov & Olga Kulikova
 Second place:  Evaldas Sodeika & Ieva Žukauskaitė
 Third place:  Vaidotas Lacitis & Veronika Golodneva
 June 11: WDSF PD European Championship (Latin) in  Saint Petersburg
 Winners:  Vitaly Panteleev & Angelina Nechkhaeva
 Second place:  Marts Smolko & Tina Bazykina
 Third place:  Pavel Pasechnik & Marta Arndt
 June 23: WDSF South European Championship in  Alassio
 Standard winners:  Rinat Sunitulin & Maria Peregudova
 Standard Second place:  Carmine Petrillo & Marzia Bonilauri
 Standard Third place:  João Carlos Costa Relha – Alicja Ciesielska
 Latin winners:  Ionuț Alexandru Miculescu & Andra Păcurar
 Latin Second place:  Vincenzo Termini & Elisa De Belardini
 Latin Third place:  Bojan Lazareski & Sarah Karakatsanis
 July 8 & 9: WDSF PD Asian Championship in 
 Standard PD winners:  Cheng Dan & LI Zhenni
 Standard PD Second place:  Oleksii Guzyr & Rikako Ota
 Standard PD Third place:  Kim Kihwan & Park Ye Rang
 Latin PD winners:  Hou Yao & Zhuang Ting
 Latin PD Second place:  Chan Hing Wai & Tin Lai Ki
 Latin PD Third place:  Wang Jun & Jia Yiwen
 July 8 & 9: WDSF Asian Championship in 
 Standard winners:  Qiu Yuming & Wei Liying
 Standard Second place:  Vladlen Kravchenko & Marina Laptiyeva
 Standard Third place:  Yuan Shaoyang & Qi Chongxuan
 Latin winners:  Kostiantyn Samarskyi & Tay Isabelle
 Latin Second place:  Artem Semerenko & Valeriya Kachalko
 Latin Third place:  Aleksei Kibkalo & Tatiana Kogadei
 September 9: WDSF World Junior II Championship in  Bratislava
 September 9 & 10: WDSF World Championship in  Chengdu
 September 16: WDSF PD World Championship in  Prague
 September 22 & 23: WDSF PD World Championship (Master Class) in  Bertrange
 September 23: WDSF World Championship (Senior I) in  Kistelek
 October 7: WDSF World Ten Dance Championship in  Marseille
 October 14: WDSF World Youth Latin Championship in  Castell-Platja d'Aro
 October 21: WDSF PD Latin World Championship in  Leipzig
 November 4: WDSF World Championship (U21 Ten Dance) in  Kranj
 November 4: WDSF European Cup in  Vila Nova de Famalicão
 November 11: WDSF World Championship (Cheerlanding) in  Takasaki
 November 18: WDSF World Latin Championship in  Vienna
 November 25: WDSF Formation Standard World Championship in  Braunschweig
 December 9: WDSF Formation Latin World Championship in  Vienna
 December 16: WDSF World Championship (Youth Standard) in  Riga

Darts

 December 15, 2016 – January 2: 2017 PDC World Darts Championship in  London
  Michael van Gerwen defeated  Gary Anderson, 7–3
 January 7 – 15: 2017 BDO World Darts Championship in  Frimley Green
 Men:  Glen Durrant defeated  Danny Noppert, 7–3
 Women:  Lisa Ashton defeated  Corrine Hammond, 3–0
 October 3 – 7: 2017 WDF World Cup in  Kobe
 Men: 
 Women: 
 Juniors:

PDC

Major tournaments
 January 28 – 29: 2017 Masters in  Milton Keynes
  Michael van Gerwen defeated  Gary Anderson, 11–7
  Michael van Gerwen defeated  Peter Wright, 11–10
 March 3 – 5: 2017 UK Open in  Minehead
  Peter Wright defeated  Gerwyn Price, 11–6
 June 1 – 4: 2017 PDC World Cup of Darts in  Frankfurt
  (Michael van Gerwen & Raymond van Barneveld) defeated  (Gerwyn Price & Mark Webster), 3–1
 July 22 – 30: 2017 World Matchplay in  Blackpool
  Phil Taylor defeated  Peter Wright, 18–8
 September 16 – 17: 2017 Champions League of Darts in  Cardiff
  Mensur Suljović defeated  Gary Anderson, 11–9
 October 1 – 7: 2017 World Grand Prix in  Dublin
  Daryl Gurney defeated  Simon Whitlock, 5–4
 October 27 – 29: 2017 European Championship in  Hasselt
  Michael van Gerwen defeated  Rob Cross, 11–7
 November 4 – 5: 2017 World Series of Darts Finals in  Glasgow
  Michael van Gerwen defeated  Gary Anderson, 11–6
 November 11 – 19: 2017 Grand Slam of Darts in  Wolverhampton
  Michael van Gerwen defeated  Peter Wright, 16–12
 November 24 – 26: 2017 Players Championship Finals in  Minehead
  Michael van Gerwen defeated  Jonny Clayton, 11–2
 November 26: 2017 PDC World Youth Championship Final in  Minehead
  Dimitri van den Bergh defeated  Josh Payne, 6–3

PDC European Tour
 March 24 – 26: 2017 German Darts Championship in  Hildesheim
  Peter Wright defeated  Michael van Gerwen, 6–3
 April 15 – 17: 2017 German Darts Masters in  Jena
  Michael van Gerwen defeated  Jelle Klaasen, 6–2
 April 21 – 23: 2017 German Darts Open in  Saarbrücken
  Peter Wright defeated  Benito van de Pas, 6–5
 May 5 – 7: 2017 European Darts Grand Prix in  Sindelfingen
  Peter Wright defeated  Michael van Gerwen, 6–0
 May 12 – 14: 2017 Gibraltar Darts Trophy in 
  Michael Smith defeated  Mensur Suljović, 6–4
 June 9 – 11: 2017 European Darts Matchplay in  Hamburg
  Michael van Gerwen defeated  Mensur Suljović, 6–3
 June 23 – 25: 2017 Austrian Darts Open in  Vienna
  Michael van Gerwen defeated  Michael Smith, 6–5
 June 30 – July 2: 2017 European Darts Open in  Leverkusen
  Peter Wright defeated  Mervyn King, 6–2
 September 1 – 3: 2017 Dutch Darts Masters in  Maastricht
  Michael van Gerwen defeated  Steve Beaton, 6–1
 September 8 – 10: 2017 German Darts Grand Prix in  Mannheim
  Michael van Gerwen defeated  Rob Cross, 6–3
 September 22 – 24: 2017 International Darts Open in  Riesa
  Peter Wright defeated  Kim Huybrechts, 6–5
 October 13 – 15: 2017 European Darts Trophy in  Göttingen
  Michael van Gerwen defeated  Rob Cross, 6–4

World Series of Darts
 May 24 – 25: 2017 Dubai Darts Masters in  Dubai
  Gary Anderson defeated  Michael van Gerwen, 11–7
 July 6 – 7: 2017 Shanghai Darts Masters in  Shanghai
  Michael van Gerwen defeated  Dave Chisnall, 8–0
 July 14 – 15: 2017 US Darts Masters in  Las Vegas
  Michael van Gerwen defeated  Daryl Gurney, 8–6
 August 11 – 13: 2017 Auckland Darts Masters in  Auckland
  Kyle Anderson defeated  Corey Cadby, 11–10
 August 18 – 20: 2017 Melbourne Darts Masters in  Melbourne
  Phil Taylor defeated  Peter Wright, 11–8
 August 25 – 27: 2017 Perth Darts Masters in  Perth
  Gary Anderson defeated  Raymond van Barneveld, 11–7
 October 20 – 21: 2017 German Darts Masters in  Düsseldorf
  Peter Wright defeated  Phil Taylor, 11–4

BDO

Major tournaments

 May 26 – 29: 2017 World Trophy in  Barry
 Men:  Peter Machin defeated  Martin Phillips, 10–8
 Women:  Aileen de Graaf defeated  Anastasia Dobromyslova, 6–2
 September 25–27: 2017 World Masters in  Bridlington
 Men:  Krzysztof Ratajski defeated  Mark McGeeney, 6–1
 Woman:  Lorraine Winstanley defeated  Corrine Hammond, 5–2

Disc golf

International
 May 12 – 14: 2017 Amateur World Doubles Championships in  Mount Vernon, Texas
 Advanced winners:  Ricky Ovaitt & Adam Case (m) /  Valerie Mandujano & Alexis Mandujano
 June 2 – 4: WFDF 2017 All African Ultimate Club Championships in 
 Winners:  UCT Tigers, Second place:  Ghost Ultimate, Third place:  Kampala Ultimate, Fourth place:  KFC – Kisumu Frisbee Club
 June 17 – 21: WFDF 2017 World Great Grandmasters Beach Ultimate Championships in  Lisbon
 June 18 – 24: WFDF World Championships of Beach Ultimate in  Royan
 Mixed winners: , Second place: , Third place: 
 Men's winners: , Second place: , Third place: 
 Women's winners: , Second place: , Third place: 
 Master Mixed winners: , Second place: , Third place: 
 Men's Master winners: , Second place: , Third place: 
 Women's Master winners: , Second place: , Third place: 
 Men's GrandMaster winners: , Second place: , Third place: 
 June 20 – 24: PDGA World Championships in  Augusta
 Winners:  Ricky Wysocki (m) /  Paige Pierce (f)
 July 24 – 29: WFDF 2017 World Freestyle & Overall Flying Disc Championships in  Basingstoke
 Overall winners:  Tomas Burvall (m) /  Juliana Korver (f)
 Golf winners:  Anton Lindh (m) /  Juliana Korver (f)
 Distance winners:  Anton Lindh (m) /  Niloofar Mossavarrahmani (f)
 Accuracy winners:  Conrad Damon (m) /  Juliana Korver (f)
 SCF winners:  Robert McLeod (m) /  Anneli André (f)
 Discathon winners:  Anton Kappling (m) /  Frida Högberg
 DDC winners:  (Harvey Brandt & Conrad Damon) (m) /  (Juliana Korver & Beth Verish)
 Freestyle winners:  (Larry Imperiale & Paul Kenny) (m) /  (Juliana Korver & Bianca Strunz)
 August 17 – 20: WFDF 2017 Asia Oceanic Ultimate and Guts Club Championships in  Manila
 The  win's 4 medals.  and  win's 3 medals.  win's 2 medals.
 August 23 – 26: WFDF 2017 World Team Disc Golf Championships in  Colchester
 Winners: , 2nd place: , 3rd place: 
 November 14 – 19: WFDF 2017 Pan American Ultimate Club Championships in  Cañuelas

Major tournaments
 April 12 – 15: National Collegiate Disc Golf Championships in  North Augusta, South Carolina
 Advanced winners:  Ben Clark (m) /  Bayli Miller (f)
 Teams winners:  Ferris State University (m) /  California State University
 June 2 – 4: United States Amateur Disc Golf Championships in  Milford, Michigan
 Advanced winner:  Brandon Oleskie
 August 12 – 19: 2017 PDGA Master's World Championship in  Grand Rapids, Michigan
 Winners:  Barry Schultz (m) /  Elaine King (f)
 September 8 – 10: US Masters Disc Golf Championship in  Des Moines, Iowa
 September 21 – 24: 2017 US Women's Disc Golf Championship Presented by Prodigy in  Johnson City, Tennessee
 October 4 – 7: United States Disc Golf Championship in  Rock Hill, South Carolina

2017 American National Tour
 February 23 – 26: Gentlemen's Club Challenge in  Henderson
 Winners:  Ricky Wysocki (m) /  Paige Pierce (f)
 April 27 – 29: Dynamic Discs Glass Blown Open in  Emporia, Kansas
 Winners:  Paul McBeth (m) /  Hannah Leatherman (f)
 May 19 – 21: Masters Cup in  Santa Cruz, California
 Winners:  Paul McBeth (m) /  Paige Pierce (f)
 June 9 – 11: Beaver State Fling Presented by KEEN in  Estacada, Oregon
 Winners:  Ricky Wysocki (m) /  Paige Pierce (f)
 August 25 – 27: Pittsburgh Flying Disc Open Presented by Discraft in  Pittsburgh
 Winners:  Paul McBeth (m) /  Catrina Allen (f)
 October 13 – 15: Hall of Fame Classic (final) in  Appling, Georgia

2017 Disc Golf Pro Tour
 March 1 – 4: The Memorial in  Scottsdale
 Winners:  Paul McBeth (m) /  Paige Pierce (f)
 March 17 – 19: Waco Annual Charity Open in  Waco, Texas
 Winners:  Jeremy Koling (m) /  Paige Pierce (f)
 March 31 – April 2: Nick Hyde Memorial in  Rockwall, Texas
 Winners:  Paul McBeth (m) /  Sarah Hokom (f)
 April 14 – 16: Jonesboro Open in  Jonesboro, Arkansas
 Winners:  Ricky Wysocki (m) /  Paige Pierce (f)
 June 2 – 4: Utah Open in  Ogden, Utah
 Winners:  Ricky Wysocki (m) /  Jessica Weese (f)
 August 3 – 6: Ledgestone Insurance Open in  Peoria, Illinois
 Winners:  Joshua Anthon (m) /  Valarie Jenkins (f)
 August 17 – 20: Idlewild Open in  Burlington, New York
 Winners:  James Conrad (m) /  Paige Pierce (f)
 August 31 – September 3: Vibram Open in  Leicester, Massachusetts
 Winners:  Ricky Wysocki (m) /  Paige Pierce (f)
 September 14 – 17: Green Mountain (final) in  Jeffersonville, Vermont

2017 Disc Golf World Tour
 January 26 – 29: Aussie Open 2017 in  Perth
 Winners:  Ricky Wysocki (m) /  Paige Pierce (f)
 May 12 – 14: Konopiště Open 2017 in  Benešov
 Winners:  Ricky Wysocki (m) /  Vanessa Van Dyken (f)
 July 20 – 23: European Open in  Nokia
 Winners:  Timi Järvenpää (m) /  Heidi Laine (f)
 October 4 – 7: Disc Golf World Tour Championship 2017 USDGC (final) in  Rock Hill, South Carolina

2017 European Pro Tour
 May 19 – 21: Tali Open – EPT#1 in  Helsinki
 Winners:  Jalle Stoor (m) /  Eveliina Salonen (f)
 June 9 – 11: Sula Open – EPT#2 in  Sula
 Winners:  Seppo Paju (m) /  Kristin Tattar (f)
 July 7 – 9: Skellefteå Open – EPT#3 in  Skellefteå
 Winners:  Ricky Wysocki (m) /  Ragna Bygde Lewis (f)
 July 14 – 16: Estonian Open – EPT#4 in  Tallinn
 Winners:  Paul McBeth (m) /  Henna Blomroos (f)
 July 28 – 30: Turku TBC – EPT#5 in  Turku
 Winners:  Gregg Barsby (m) /  Maija Laitinen (f)
 September 8 – 10: Strudengau Open – EPT#6 (final) in  Sankt Thomas am Blasenstein

2017 European Tour
 April 1 & 2: Dutch Discgolf Championships – ET #1 in  Rijswijk
 Winners:  Raimo Sokka (m) /  Lydie Hellgren (f)
 April 15 & 16: Isle of Mull Classic – ET#2 in  Fanmore
 Winners:  Simon Luard (m) /  Sue Underwood (f)
 May 6 & 7: Kokkedal Open – ET#3 in  Kokkedal & Hillerød
 Winners:  Karl Johan Nybo (m) /  Camilla Grundén (f)
 May 25 – 27: Westside Discs Tyyni – ET#4 in  Helsinki & Sipoo
 Winners:  Mikke Haaranen (m) /  Mila Puumala (f)
 June 2 – 4: The Battle at Bluebell Woods – ET#5 in  Dunbar
 Winners:  Blær Örn Ásgeirsson (m) /  Sue Underwood (f)
 July 1 & 2: Iceland Solstice Showdown – ET#6 in  Reykjavík
 Winners:  Nikko Locastro (m) /  Lydie Hellgren (f)
 August 4 – 6: Valgjärve Open – ET#7 in  Valgjärve
 Winners:  Jeremy Koling (m) /  Kristin Tattar (f)
 August 12 & 13: Chateau Hostačov Open – ET#8 in  Golčův Jeníkov
 Winners:  Přemysl Novák (m) /  Eva Králová (f)
 August 19 & 20: Belgian Open – ET#9 in  Braine-l'Alleud
 Winners:  Tony Ferro (m) /  Hayley Flintoft (f)
 September 22 – 24: Copenhagen Open Classic – presented by DGA – ET#10 (final)	in  Copenhagen

Equestrianism

Fencing

Field hockey
 January 13 – TBD: 2017 FIH Schedule

2016–17 Men's FIH Hockey World League

Round 2:
 March 4 – 12: Event #1 in  Dhaka
 Qualified national teams to Semifinals:  & 
 March 11 – 19: Event #2 in  Ulster
 Qualified national teams to Semifinals:  & 
 March 25 – April 2: Event #3 in  Tunapuna
 Qualified national teams to Semifinals:  & 
semifinals: 
 June 15 – 25: Semifinal #1 in  London
 July 8 – 23: Semifinal #2 in  Johannesburg
final:
 December 2 – 10: Final in  Bhubaneswar
  defeated , 2–1, to win their second consecutive Men's FIH Hockey World League title.
  took third place.

2016–17 Women's FIH Hockey World League

Round 2
 January 14 – 22: Event #1 in  Kuala Lumpur
 February 4 – 12: Event #2 in  Valencia
 April 1 – 9: Event #3 in  Vancouver
 Qualified national teams to Semifinals:  & 
semifinals
 June 21 – July 2: Semifinal #1 in  Brussels
 July 8 – 23: Semifinal #2 in  Johannesburg
final
 November 18 – 26: Final in  Auckland
 The  defeated , 3–0, to win their second Women's FIH Hockey World League title.
  took third place.

Continental field hockey events

EHF
 January 13 – 15: 2017 EuroHockey Men's Indoor Junior Nations Championship in  Lisbon
  defeated , 5–4, in the final.  took third place.
 January 20 – 22: 2017 EuroHockey Women's Indoor Junior Nations Championship in  Vienna
 The  defeated , 1–1 (1–0 shoot out), in the final.  took third place.
 February 10 – 12: 2017 EuroHockey Men's Indoor Club Cup in  Vienna
  Uhlenhorst Mulheim defeated  SV Arminen, 3–2, in the final.  AH&BC Amsterdam took third place.
 February 10 – 12: 2017 EuroHockey Men's Indoor Club Trophy in  Sveti Ivan Zelina
 Champions:  Racing Club de Bruxelles; Second:  HC Rotweiss Wettingen; Third:  HC Minsk
 February 17 – 19: 2017 EuroHockey Women's Indoor Club Cup in  Wettingen
  Mannheimer HC defeated  HC Minsk, 5–3, in the final.  HC Rotweiss Wettingen took third place.
 February 17 – 19: 2017 EuroHockey Women's Indoor Club Trophy in  Šiauliai
 Champions:  MSC Sumchanka; Second:   Dundee Wanderers; Third:  East Grinstead
 June 2 – 5: 2017 EuroHockey Women's Club Cup in  's-Hertogenbosch
  's-Hertogenbosch defeated  UHC Hamburg, 2–1 in the final.  AH&BC Amsterdam took third place.
 June 2 – 5: 2017 EuroHockey Men's Club Trophy in  Elektrostal
  HC Rotweiss Wettingen defeated  SV Arminen, 1–0, in the final.  Dinamo Elektrostal took third place.
 June 2 – 5: 2017 Eurohockey Women's Club Trophy in  Munich
  Münchner SC defeated  Club Campo de Madrid, 1–0, in the final.  HC Minsk took third place.
 June 3 & 4: 2016–17 EuroHockey League Final Four in  Brasschaat
  Rot-Weiss Köln defeated  HC Oranje-Rood, 3–2, in the final.  KHC Dragons took third place.
 July 5 – 8: 2017 EuroHockey 5s for Boys in  Wałcz
  defeated , 4–2, in the final.  took third place.
 July 12 – 15: 2017 EuroHockey 5s for Girls in  Wattignies
  defeated , 6–3, in the final.  took third place.
 August 18 – 27: 2017 EuroHockey Championships for Men and Women in  Amsterdam
 Men: The  defeated , 4–2, in the final.  took third place.
 Women: The  defeated , 3–0, in the final.  took third place.
 August 28 – September 3: 2017 EuroHockey Nations Junior Championships for Men and Women in  Valencia
 Men: The  defeated , 5–3 in a shootout and after a 2–2 score in regular play, in the final.
 Women: The  defeated , 6–0, in the final.  took third place.

AsHF
 October 11 – 22: 2017 Men's Hockey Asia Cup in  Dhaka
  defeated , 2–1, to win their third Men's Hockey Asia Cup title. 
  took third place.
 October 28 – November 5: 2017 Women's Hockey Asia Cup in  Kakamigahara, Gifu
  defeated , 5–4 in penalties and after a 1–1 score in regular play, to win their second Women's Hockey Asia Cup title.
  took third place.

PaHF
 August 4 – 12: 2017 Men's Pan American Cup in  Lancaster, Pennsylvania
  defeated , 2–0, to win their second consecutive and third overall Men's Pan American Cup title.
 The  took third place.
 August 5 – 13: 2017 Women's Pan American Cup in  Lancaster, Pennsylvania
  defeated , 4–1, to win their fifth consecutive Women's Pan American Cup title.
 The  took third place.

OHF
 October 11 – 15: 2017 Oceania Cup for Men and Women in  Sydney
 Men:  defeated , 6–0, to win their tenth consecutive Men's Oceania Cup title.
  took third place.
 Women:  defeated , 2–0, to win their third consecutive and seventh overall Women's Oceania Cup title.
  took third place.
 Note: Both Australian teams have qualified to compete at the 2018 Men's Hockey World Cup and 2018 Women's Hockey World Cup.

AfHF
 October 22 – 29: 2017 Hockey Africa Cup of Nations for Men and Women in  Ismailia
 Men:  defeated , 2–1, to win their eighth consecutive Men's Hockey Africa Cup of Nations title.
  took third place.
 Women:  defeated , 4–0, to win their seventh consecutive Women's Hockey Africa Cup of Nations title.
  took third place.
 Note: Both South African teams have qualified to compete at the 2018 Men's Hockey World Cup and the 2018 Women's Hockey World Cup.

Figure skating

Fistball

World Games
 July 22 – 25: Fistball at the 2017 World Games in  Wrocław
 In the final,  defeated , 4–3 (9–11, 7–11, 11–6, 7–11, 11–8, 12–10, 11–9). 
  took third place.

Continental & International championships
 July 15 – 16: EFA 2017 Fistball U18 Men's and Women's European Championship in  Böttstein
 Men's:  defeated , 3–0 (12–10, 11–5, 11–6). 
  took third place.
 Women's:  defeated , 3–1 (12–10, 10–12, 11–7, 11–8).
  took third place.
 August 26 & 27: Women's European Cup + U21 Men's European Cup in  Calw
 Women's winner: 
 Men's U21 winner: 
 TBD: IFA 2017 Fistball Women´s and Men's World Cup in TBD location
 October 20 – 22: 2017 Fistball U18 South America Championships & Cups in  Santiago
 November 24 – 26: 2017 Fistball South America Championships & Cups in  Buenos Aires

European Fistball Association
 January 13 – 14: Men's Champions Cup Indoor 2017 in  Freistadt
 In the final,  TSV Pfungstadt defeated  Union Compact Freistadt, 4–0.
  VfK 01 Berlin took third place.
 January 14 – 15: Women's Champions Cup Indoor 2017 in  Großenkneten
 In the final,  TSV Dennach defeated  Ahlhorner SV, 4–0. 
  TV Jona took third place.
 July 7 – 9: EFA 2017 Fistball Men's European Champions Cup in  Jona
 In the final,  TSV Dennach defeated  Ahlhorner SV, 3–1. 
  FBC ABAU Linz Urfahr took third place.
 July 7 – 9: EFA 2017 Fistball Women's European Champions Cup in  Käfertal
 In the final,  TSV Pfungstadt defeated  VfK 1901 Berlin, 4–0.
  STV Wigoltingen took third place.
 July 7 – 9: EFA 2017 Fistball Men's European Cup in  Diepoldsau
 In the final,  SVD Diepoldsau-Schmitter defeated  MTV Rosenheim, 4–0.
  Union Compact Freistadt took third place.

Floorball
 May 3 – 7: 2017 Men's under-19 World Floorball Championships in  Växjö
 A Division: In the final,  defeated , 7–4, to their fourth Men's U19 Floorball World Championships.  took third place.
 B Division:  are promoted to A-division for U19 WFC 2019.
 August 23 – 27: EuroFloorball Challenge in  Trenčín
 In the final,  Tsunami Záhorská Bystrica defeated  FBC Skala Melitopol, 9–4.  ŠK 1.FBC Trenčín took third place.
 October 6 – 8: Champions Cup in  Seinäjoki
 Men's champion:  IBF Falun
 Women's champion:  IKSU
 October 17 – 21: EuroFloorball Cup in  Valmiera
 December 1 – 9: 2017 Women's World Floorball Championships in  Bratislava
 Champion:

Freestyle skiing

Futsal

Golf

2017 Men's major golf championships
 April 6 – 9: 2017 Masters Tournament
Winner:  Sergio García (1st major championship, 10th PGA Tour victory, 13th European Tour victory)
 June 15 – 18: 2017 U.S. Open
 Winner:  Brooks Koepka (first Major championship win; second PGA Tour win)
 July 20 – 23: 2017 Open Championship
 Winner:  Jordan Spieth (third Major championship win, first Open Championship win; 11th PGA Tour win)
 August 10 – 13: 2017 PGA Championship
 Winner:  Justin Thomas (first Major championship win; fifth PGA Tour win)

2017 World Golf Championships (WGC)
 March 2 – 5: 2017 WGC-Mexico Championship 
Winner:  Dustin Johnson (2nd WGC-Mexico Championship championship and 4th WGC championship overall; 14th PGA Tour victory)
 March 22 – 26: WGC-Dell Technologies Match Play
Winner:  Dustin Johnson (1st WGC-Dell Technologies Match Play championship and 5th WGC championship overall; 15th PGA Tour victory)
 August 3 – 6: 2017 WGC-Bridgestone Invitational
Winner:  Hideki Matsuyama (1st WGC-Bridgestone Invitational championship and 2nd WGC championship overall; 5th PGA Tour victory)
 October 26 – 29: 2017 WGC-HSBC Champions
Winner:  Justin Rose (1st WGC-HSBC Champions championship and 2nd WGC championship overall; 8th PGA Tour victory)

Other men's golf events
 May 11 – 14: 2017 Players Championship
 Winner:  Kim Si-woo (first Players Championship title; second PGA win)
 May 25 – 28: 2017 BMW PGA Championship
 Winner:  Alex Norén (first BMW PGA Championship win; ninth PGA European Tour win)
 September 28 – October 1: 2017 Presidents Cup
  Team USA defeated the  International Team, 19–11, to win their seventh consecutive and tenth overall Presidents Cup title.

2017 Senior major golf championships
 May 18 – 21: Regions Tradition
 Winner:  Bernhard Langer (second consecutive Regions Tradition win; 31st PGA Tour Champions win)
 May 25 – 28: Senior PGA Championship
 Winner:  Bernhard Langer (first Senior PGA Championship win; 32nd PGA Tour Champions win)
 June 29 – July 2: U.S. Senior Open
 Winner:  Kenny Perry (second U.S. Senior Open win; ninth PGA Tour Champions win)
 July 13 – 16: Senior Players Championship
 Winner:  Scott McCarron (first Senior Players Championship win; fourth PGA Tour Champions win)
 July 27 – 30: Senior Open Championship
 Winner:  Bernhard Langer (third Senior Open Championship win; 33rd PGA Tour Champions win)

2017 Women's major golf championships
 March 30 – April 2: 2017 ANA Inspiration
Winner:  Ryu So-yeon (1st ANA Inspiration Championship and 2nd Major championship win; 4th LPGA Tour victory)
 June 29 – July 2: 2017 KPMG Women's PGA Championship
Winner:  Danielle Kang (1st Women's PGA Championship and 1st LPGA Tour win)
 July 13 – 16: 2017 U.S. Women's Open
Winner:  Park Sung-hyun (1st U.S. Women's Open and 1st LPGA Tour win)
 August 3 – 6: 2017 Women's British Open
Winner:  In-Kyung Kim (1st Women's British Open win and 7th LPGA Tour win)
 September 14 – 17: 2017 Evian Championship
Winner:  Anna Nordqvist (1st Women's Evian Championship win and 2nd Major championship win; 8th LPGA Tour victory)

Senior LPGA Championship
 July 10 – 12: 2017 Senior LPGA Championship at The Pete Dye Course of the French Lick Resort Casino in French Lick, Indiana
 Winner:  Trish Johnson (first Senior LPGA Championship title win; second Legends Tour win)

2017 Solheim Cup
 August 18 – 20: 2017 Solheim Cup at the Composite Course of Des Moines Golf and Country Club  in West Des Moines, Iowa
 Team  USA defeated Team  Europe, 16½ to 11½ points, to win their second consecutive and tenth overall Solheim Cup title.

Gymnastics

Handball

World handball events
 January 11 – 29: 2017 World Men's Handball Championship in 
  defeated , 33–26, to win their second consecutive and sixth overall World Men's Handball Championship title. 
  took third place.
 June 12 – 18: 2017 IHF Emerging Nations Championship in 
 The  defeated , 26–25, to win their second consecutive IHF Emerging Nations Championship title.
  took third place.
 July 11 – 16: 2017 Youth Beach Handball World Championships for Men and Women in 
 Men:  defeated , 2–1 in matches played, in the final.  took third place.
 July 18 – 30: 2017 Men's Junior World Handball Championship in 
  defeated , 39–38 at extra time, to win their first Men's Junior World Handball Championship title.
  took third place.
 August 8 – 20: 2017 Men's Youth World Handball Championship in 
  defeated , 28–25, to win their second consecutive Men's Youth World Handball Championship title.
  took third place.
 August 25 – 28: 2017 IHF Super Globe in  Doha
  Barcelona defeated  Füchse Berlin, 29–25, to win their third IHF Super Globe title.
  RK Vardar took third place.
 December 1 – 17: 2017 World Women's Handball Championship in 
  defeated , 23–21, to win their second World Women's Handball Championship title.
  took third place.

EHF

EHF Nations events
 June 20 – 25: 2017 European Beach Handball Championship for Men and Women at  Jarun Lake, Zagreb
 Men:  defeated , 2–0 in sets won, to win their third Men's European Beach Handball Championship title.
  took third place.
 Women:  defeated , 2–0 in sets won, to win their first Women's European Beach Handball Championship title.
  took third place.
 July 2 – 8: 2017 European Universities Handball Championships in  Antequera
 Men:  Ștefan cel Mare University of Suceava defeated  University of Duisburg-Essen, 23–22, in the final. 
 Women:  German Sport University Cologne defeated  University of Aveiro, 41–30, in the final.
 July 3 – 7: 2017 European Open Handball Championship for Men in  Gothenburg
  defeated , 34–22, to win their fourth European Open Handball Championship title.
  took third place.
 July 27 – August 6: 2017 European Women's U-19 Handball Championship in  Celje
  defeated , 31–26, to win their first European Women's U-19 Handball Championship title.
  took third place.
 August 14 – 20: 2017 European Women's U-17 Handball Championship in  Klaipėda and  Skopje
  defeated , 23–18, to win their first European Women's U-17 Handball Championship title.
  took third place.

EHF Club events for Men
 August 30, 2016 – April 9, 2017: 2016–17 SEHA League
  RK Vardar defeated  MVM Veszprém, 26–21, to win their third SEHA League title.
  HC Meshkov Brest took third place.
 September 3, 2016 – May 21, 2017: 2016–17 EHF Cup
  Frisch Auf Göppingen defeated fellow German team, Füchse Berlin, 30–22, to win their second consecutive and fourth overall EHF Cup title.
  SC Magdeburg took third place.
 September 3, 2016 – June 4, 2017: 2016–17 EHF Champions League
  RK Vardar defeated  Paris Saint-Germain, 24–23, to win their first EHF Champions League title.
  MVM Veszprém took third place.
 November 19, 2016 – May 27, 2017: 2016–17 EHF Challenge Cup
  Sporting CP defeated  AHC Potaissa Turda, 67–52 on aggregate, to win their first EHF Challenge Cup title.

EHF Club events for Women
 September 9, 2016 – May 14, 2017: 2016–17 Women's EHF Cup
  Rostov-Don defeated  SG BBM Bietigheim, 53–46 on aggregate, to win their first Women's EHF Cup title.
 September 10, 2016 – May 7, 2017: 2016–17 Women's EHF Champions League
  Győri ETO defeated  HC Vardar, 31–30 in extra time, to win their third Women's EHF Champions League title.
  CSM Bucharest took third place.
 October 15, 2016 – May 14, 2017: 2016–17 Women's EHF Challenge Cup
  RK Lokomotiva Zagreb defeated  H 65 Höör, 47–40 on aggregate, to win their first Women's EHF Challenge Cup title.

PATHF
 February 21 – 25: 2017 Pan American Youth Beach Handball Championship in  Asunción (debut event)
 Men:  defeated , 2–1 in matches played, in the final.  took third place.
 Women:  defeated , 2–0 in matches played, in the final.  took third place.
 March 20 – 25: 2017 Pan American Men's Junior Handball Championship in  Asunción
  defeated , 31–23, to win their third consecutive and sixth overall Pan American Men's Junior Handball Championship title. 
  took third place.
 April 15 – 22: 2017 Pan American Men's Youth Handball Championship in  Santiago
  defeated , 22–21 in overtime, to win their eighth Pan American Men's Youth Handball Championship title.
  took third place.
 May 24 – 28: 2017 Pan American Men's Club Handball Championship in  Buenos Aires
 Champions:  EC Pinheiros; Second:  Handebol Taubaté; Third:  UNLu
 Note: EC Pinheiros has qualified to compete at the 2017 IHF Super Globe.
 June 18 – 25: 2017 Pan American Women's Handball Championship in  Buenos Aires
  defeated , 38–20, to win their fourth consecutive and tenth overall Pan American Women's Handball Championship title.
  took third place.
 Note: All three teams mentioned above all qualified to compete in the 2017 World Women's Handball Championship.
 October 23 – 28: 2017 Pan American Women's Club Handball Championship in  Asunción
  EC Pinheiros defeated  Atlético Goes, 33–23, to win their first Pan American Women's Club Handball Championship title. 
  Jockey Club Córdoba took third place.

AHF
 March 13 – 22: 2017 Asian Women's Handball Championship in  Suwon
  defeated , 30–20, to win their third consecutive and thirteenth overall Asian Women's Handball Championship title.
  took third place.
 Note: All three teams mentioned above have qualified to compete at the 2017 World Women's Handball Championship.
 May 8 – 15: 2017 Asian Beach Handball Championship for Men and Women in  Pattaya
 Men: Champions: ; Second: ; Third: 
 Women: Champions: ; Second: ; Third: ; Fourth: 
 July 15 – 23: 2017 Asian Women's Junior Handball Championship in 
 Champions: ; Second: ; Third: ; Fourth: 
 Note: All teams mentioned above have qualified to compete at the 2018 Women's Junior World Handball Championship.
 August 20 – 28: 2017 Asian Women's Youth Handball Championship in  Jakarta
 Champions: ; Second: ; Third: ; Fourth: 
 Note: All teams mentioned above have qualified to compete at the 2018 Women's Youth World Handball Championship.
 September 23 – 29: 2017 Asian Women's Club League Handball Championship in  Tashkent
 Champions:  AGMK Club; Second:  Ile Club; Third:  Almaty Club
 November 20 – 30: 2017 Asian Club League Handball Championship in  Hyderabad
 Champions:  Al-Najma; Second:  Al-Duhail; Third:  Al-Ahli
 November 21 – 27: 2017 West Asian Women's Championship in  Manama

CAHB
 April 12: 2017 African Handball Super Cup for Men and Women in  Agadir
 Men:  Al Ahly defeated fellow Egyptian team, Zamalek, 29–23.
 Women:  1º de Agosto defeated  CARA Brazzaville, 26–17.
 Note: Al Ahly and 1º de Agosto have qualified to compete in the 2017 IHF Super Globe event.
 April 13 – 22: 2017 African Handball Cup Winners' Cup for Men and Women in  Agadir
 Men:  Al Ahly defeated  AS Hammamet, 31–22, to win their second African Handball Cup Winners' Cup title. 
  Widad Smara took third place.
 Women:  1º de Agosto defeated  FAP Yaoundé, 24–16, to win their third consecutive African Women's Handball Cup Winners' Cup title.
  CARA Brazzaville took third place.
 September 4 – 10: 2017 African Women's Junior Handball Championship in  Abidjan
  defeated , 29–19, to win their third consecutive and ninth overall African Women's Junior Handball Championship title.
 Note: The two teams mentioned here, plus , have qualified to compete at the 2018 Women's Junior World Handball Championship.
 September 11 – 17: 2017 African Women's Youth Handball Championship in  Abidjan
 Champions: ; Second: ; Third: 
 October 20 – 29: 2017 African Handball Champions League for Men and Women in  Hammamet
 Men:  Zamalek defeated  Espérance, 31–29 in extra time, to win their tenth Men's African Handball Champions League title.
  Al Ahly took third place.
 Note: Zamalek has qualified to compete at the 2018 IHF Super Globe.
 Women:  Primeiro de Agosto defeated  ASF Sfax, 30–17, to win their fourth consecutive African Women's Handball Champions League title.
  FAP Yaoundé took third place.

Ice hockey

Judo

Karate

Kickboxing

Korfball

World Cups and Continental Championships
 April 13 – 17: 2017 U19 Korfball World Cup in  Leeuwarden
 In the final,  defeated , 28–16. 
  took third place.
 June 23 – 25: 2017 U17 Korfball World Cup in  Schijndel
 In the final,  defeated , 22–11. 
  took third place.
 August 8 – 13: IKF Asia U19 & U16 Korfball4 Championship in 
 August 19 & 20: IKF Open European Beach Korfball Championship 2017 in  The Hague
 U19: In the final,  2 defeated , 8–6.
  1 took third place.
 Seniors: In the final,  2 defeated , 8–4.
  1 took third place.

Europe
 January 12 – 14: 2017 Korfball Europa Cup in 
 In the final,  KV TOP defeated  Boeckenberg KC, 37–27, to win her 3rd Europa Cup. 
  Trojans Korfball Club took third place. 
 January 27 – 29: 2017 Korfball Europa Shield in 
 In the final,  Bec Korfball Club defeated  Schweriner KC, 10–9, to win her 3rd consecutive Europa Shield. 
  CRC Quinta Dos Lombos took third place.

Lacrosse

Lacrosse World Cup
 July 12 – 22: 2017 Women's Lacrosse World Cup in  Guildford
 The  defeated , 10–5, to win their third consecutive and eighth overall Women's Lacrosse World Cup title.
  won the bronze medal.

Major League Lacrosse
 April 22 – August 19: 2017 Major League Lacrosse season
 The  Ohio Machine defeated the  Denver Outlaws, 17–12, to win their first Major League Lacrosse title.

NCAA Lacrosse Championship
 May 7 – 28: 2017 NCAA Division III Men's Lacrosse Championship at Gillette Stadium in  Foxborough, Massachusetts
 The  Salisbury Sea Gulls defeated the  RIT Tigers, 15–7, to win their second consecutive and 12th overall NCAA Division III Men's Lacrosse Championship title.
 May 12 – 28: 2017 NCAA Division I Women's Lacrosse Championship at Gillette Stadium in  Foxborough, Massachusetts
 The  Maryland Terrapins defeated the  Boston College Eagles, 16–13, to win their 13th NCAA Division I Women's Lacrosse Championship title.
 May 13 – 28: 2017 NCAA Division II Men's Lacrosse Championship at Gillette Stadium in  Foxborough, Massachusetts
 The  Limestone Saints defeated the  Merrimack Warriors, 11–9, to win their fifth NCAA Division II Men's Lacrosse Championship title.
 May 13 – 29: 2017 NCAA Division I Men's Lacrosse Championship at Gillette Stadium in  Foxborough, Massachusetts
 The  Maryland Terrapins defeated the  Ohio State Buckeyes, 9–6, to win their third NCAA Division I Men's Lacrosse Championship title.
 May 19 – 21: 2017 NCAA Division II Women's Lacrosse Championship at BU Sports Stadium in  Bloomsburg, Pennsylvania
 The  Adelphi Panthers defeated the  Florida Southern Moccasins, 6–4, to win their eighth NCAA Division II Women's Lacrosse Championship title.
 May 27 & 28: 2017 NCAA Division III Women's Lacrosse Championship at Donald J. Kerr Stadium in  Salem, Virginia
 The  Gettysburg Bullets defeated the  TCNJ Lions, 6–5, to win their second NCAA Division III Women's Lacrosse Championship title.

Luge

Mixed martial arts

Modern pentathlon

Motorsport

Multi-sport events
 January 28 – February 8: 2017 Winter Universiade in  Almaty
  won both the gold and overall medal tallies.
 February 12 – 17: 2017 European Youth Olympic Winter Festival in  Erzurum
  won both the gold and overall medal tallies. 
 February 19 – 26: 2017 Asian Winter Games in  Sapporo
  won both the gold and overall medal tallies.
 February 23 – 27: 2017 Winter Military World Games in  Sochi
  won both the gold and overall medal tallies.
 April 21 – 30: 2017 World Masters Games in  Auckland
 For results, click here.
 May 12 – 22: 2017 Islamic Solidarity Games in  Baku
  won the gold medal tally;  won the overall medal tally.
 May 29 – June 3: 2017 Games of the Small States of Europe in  City of San Marino
  won both the gold and overall medal tallies.
 June 24 – 30: 2017 Island Games in 
 The  won both the gold and overall medal tallies.
 July 13 – 21 : 2017 ASEAN School Games in 
  won both the gold and overall medal tallies.
 July 16 – 23: 2017 North American Indigenous Games in  Toronto
  won both the gold and overall medal tallies.
 July 18 – 23: 2017 Commonwealth Youth Games in  Nassau
  won both the gold and overall medal tallies.
 July 18 – 30: 2017 Summer Deaflympics in  Samsun
  won both the gold and overall medal tallies.
 July 20 – 30: World Games 2017 in  Wrocław
  won both the gold and overall medal tallies.
 July 21 – 30: 2017 Jeux de la Francophonie in  Abidjan
  won both the gold and overall medal tallies.
 July 22 – 30: 2017 European Youth Summer Olympic Festival in  Győr
  won both the gold and overall medal tallies.
 July 28 – August 13: 2017 Canada Summer Games in  Winnipeg
  won both the gold and overall medal tallies.
 August 7 – 16: 2017 World Police and Fire Games in  Los Angeles
 Note: These Games was supposed to be in Montreal, but it was relocated because of a boycott by the police and firefighter unions over pension reform.
 For results, click here.
 August 19 – 30: 2017 Summer Universiade in  Taipei
  won both the gold and overall medal tallies.
 August 19 – 31: 2017 Southeast Asian Games, in  Kuala Lumpur
  won both the gold and overall medal tallies.
 September 17 – 23: 2017 ASEAN Para Games in  Kuala Lumpur
  won the gold medal tally.  won the overall medal tally.
 September 17 – 27: 2017 Asian Indoor and Martial Arts Games in  Ashgabat
  won both the gold and overall medal tallies.
 September 23 – 30: 2017 Invictus Games in  Toronto
 For results, click here.
 September 29 – October 8: 2017 South American Youth Games in  Santiago
  won both the gold and overall medal tallies.
 November 11 – 25: 2017 Bolivarian Games in  Santa Marta
  won both the gold and overall medal tallies.
 November 12 – 19: 2017 Asian Youth Games in  Jakarta
 Event cancelled. No alternate city here to host this event. The 2021 Asian Youth Games will be the next edition to be hosted.
 December 3 – 17: 2017 Central American Games in  Managua
  won both the gold and overall medal tallies.
 December 4 – 15: 2017 Pacific Mini Games in  Port Vila
 / won the gold medal tally.  won the overall medal tally.
 December 10 – 14: 2017 Asian Youth Para Games in  Dubai
  won the gold medal tally.  won the overall medal tally.

Netball

Continental and World Cup
 March 3 – 5: 2017 European U17 Championships in 
Championship winners: 
Challenge winners: 
 Invitation winner:  Dubai
 May 11 – 14: Netball Europe Open Challenge in 
 Winners: 
 Second Place: 
 Third place: 
 May 11 – 14: 2017 European U21 Championships in 
 Winners: 
 Second Place: 
 Third place: 
 May 14 – 21: 2017 Asian Youth Netball Championship in 
 Winners: 
 Second Place: 
 Third Place: 
 July 8 – 16: 2017 Netball World Youth Cup in 
 Winners: 
 Second Place: 
 Third Place: 
 October 5 – 8: Netball Europe Open Championships in

Netball New Zealand Super Club
 July 2 – 7: 2017 Netball New Zealand Super Club in  Nelson
 In the final,  Southern Steel defeated  Northern Mystics, 79–58, to win their inaugural cup.  New South Wales Institute of Sport took third place.

Suncorp Super Netball
 February 18 – June 17:  2017 Suncorp Super Netball season
 In the final,  Sunshine Coast Lightning defeated  Giants Netball, 65–48.  Melbourne Vixens take third place.

ANZ Premiership
 March 26 – June 28:  2017 ANZ Premiership season
 In the final, Southern Steel defeated Central Pulse, 69–53, to win their inaugural season. Northern Mystics took third place.

Test matches
 February 7:  defeated  92–27.
 February 8:  defeated  72–39.

Series
 January 28:  defeated , 57–50, in  Durban
 January 28:  defeated , 66–55, after overtime in  Durban
 January 31:  defeated , 62–46, in  Durban
 February 2:  defeated , 61–37, in  Liverpool
 February 5:  defeated , 70–39, in  London
 February 5:  defeated , 47–46, in  London

Nordic combined

Nordic skiing

Orienteering

Pickleball
 September 13 – 17: The first Bainbridge Cup held in Madrid, Spain along with the Spanish Open Pickleball Championships

Racquetball

Radio-controlled racing

Rowing

Rugby league

World rugby league championships
  defeated , 6–0, to win their second consecutive and eleventh overall Rugby League World Cup title.
 November 16 – December 2: 2017 Women's Rugby League World Cup in 
  Australia defeated  New Zealand, 23–16, to win their second consecutive Women's Rugby League World Cup title.

Club seasons and championships
February 18 & 19: 2017 World Club Series in 
Game 1:  Warrington Wolves defeated  Brisbane Broncos, 27–18, at Halliwell Jones Stadium, Warrington
Game 2 (World Club Challenge):  Wigan Warriors defeated  Cronulla-Sutherland Sharks, 22–6, at DW Stadium, Wigan
 The  Leeds Rhinos defeated the  Castleford Tigers, 24–6, to win their eighth Super League title.
 The  Melbourne Storm defeated the  North Queensland Cowboys, 34–6, to win their third NRL title.

Rugby sevens

Rugby union

Sailing

Shooting sport

2017 ISSF World Cup
 February 22 – March 4: All Guns World Cup #1 in  New Delhi
 Pistol
 10 m Air Pistol winners:  Tomoyuki Matsuda (m) /  LIN Yuemei (f)
 Men's 25 m Rapid Fire Pistol winner:  LAO Jiajie
 Men's 50 m Pistol winner:  Jitu Rai
 Women's 25 m Pistol winner:  Naphaswan Yangpaiboon
 Rifle
 10 m Air Rifle winners:  SONG Buhan (m) /  SHI Mengyao (f)
 50 m Rifle Three Positions winners:  Hui Zicheng (m) /  ZHANG Yiwen (f)
 Men's 50 m Rifle Prone winner:  Toshikazu Yamashita
 Shotgun
 Skeet winners:  Riccardo Filippelli (m) /  Kim Rhode (f)
 Trap winners:  Simone d'Ambrosio (m) /  Penny Smith (f)
 Men's Double Trap winner:  James Willett
 March 17 – 27: Shotgun World Cup #1 in  Acapulco
 Skeet winners:  Marco Sablone (m) /  Kim Rhode (f)
 Trap winners:  Alberto Fernández (m) /  Ashley Carroll (f)
 Men's Double Trap winner:  Ankur Mittal
 April 28 – May 8: Shotgun World Cup #2 (final) in  Larnaca
 Skeet winners:  Federico Gil (m) /  Wei Meng (f)
 Trap winners:  Antonio Bailon (m) /  WANG Xiaojing (f)
 Men's Double Trap winner:  Daniele Di Spigno
 May 17 – 24: Rifle and Pistol World Cup #1 in  Munich
 Pistol
 10 m Air Pistol winners:  Pavlo Korostylov (m) /  Anna Korakaki (f)
 Men's 25 m Rapid Fire Pistol winner:  Jean Quiquampoix
 Men's 50 m Pistol winner:  Jin Jong-oh
 Women's 25 m Pistol winner:  Zhang Jingjing
 Rifle
 10 m Air Rifle winners:  Sergey Kamenskiy (m) /  Laura Georgeta Ilie (f)
 50 m Rifle Three Positions winners:  Alexis Raynaud (m) /  Snježana Pejčić (f)
 Men's 50 m Rifle Prone winner:  Kim Jong-hyun
 June 6 – 14: Rifle and Pistol World Cup #2 (final) in  Qabala
 Pistol
 10 m Air Pistol winners:  YANG Wei (m) /  Sylvia Steiner (f)
 Men's 25 m Rapid Fire Pistol winner:  Christian Reitz
 Men's 50 m Pistol winner:  Oleh Omelchuk
 Women's 25 m Pistol winner:  LIN Yuemei
 Rifle
 10 m Air Rifle winners:  Milutin Stefanović (m) /  PENG Xinyi (f)
 50 m Rifle Three Positions winners:  István Péni (m) /  SHI Mengyao (f)
 Men's 50 m Rifle Prone winner:  Torben Grimmel
 October 23 – 30: All Guns World Cup #2 (final) in  New Delhi
 Pistol
 10 m Air Pistol winners:  Tomoyuki Matsuda (m) /  Céline Goberville (f)
 Men's 25 m Rapid Fire Pistol winner:  Keith Sanderson
 Men's 50 m Pistol winner:  Damir Mikec
 Women's 25 m Pistol winner:  Kim Min-jung
 Mixed 10 m Air Pistol winners:  (Heena Sidhu & Jitu Rai)
 Rifle
 10 m Air Rifle winners:  István Péni (m) /  Andrea Arsović (f)
 50 m Rifle Three Positions winners:  Alexis Raynaud (m) /  Jolyn Beer (f)
 Men's 50 m Rifle Prone winner:  Torben Grimmel
 Mixed 10 m Air Rifle winners:  (SONG Buhan & WU Mingyang)
 Shotgun
 Skeet winners:  Riccardo Filippelli (m) /  Kim Rhode (f)
 Trap winners:  Alberto Fernández (m) /  Alessia Iezzi (f)
 Men's Double Trap winner:  Hu Binyuan (World Record)
 Mixed Team Trap winners:  (Antonio Bailon & Beatriz Martinez)

International and continental shooting events
 March 6 – 12: 2017 10m European Shooting Championships in  Maribor

  won both the gold and overall medal tallies.
 April 19 – May 3: 2017 African Shooting Championships in  Cairo
  won both the gold and overall medal tallies.
 June 22 – 26: 2017 ISSF Target Sprint World Championships in  Suhl
 Target Sprint winners:  Michael Herr (m) /  Anita Flack (f)
 Junior Target Sprint winners:  Sven Mueller (m) /  Madlen Guggenmos (f)
 Team Target Sprint winners:  (m) /  (f)
 Mixed Team Target Sprint winners:  (Pavla Schorna Matyasova & Tomas Bystricky)
 June 22 – 29: 2017 ISSF Junior World Championships in Rifle and Pistol in  Suhl

  won both the gold and overall medal tallies.
 July 21 – August 4: 2017 European Shooting Championships in  Baku
  won the gold medal tally.  won the overall medal tally.
 August 15 – 22: 2017 ISSF Junior Shotgun World Cup in  Porpetto
 Junior Trap winners:  Adria Martinez Torres (m) /  Erica Sessa (f)
 Junior Men's Double Trap winner:  James Dedman
 Junior Skeet winners:  Elia Sdruccioli (m) /  Katharina Monika Jacob (f)
 August 30 – September 11: 2017 World Shotgun Championships in  Moscow
 Senior Trap winners:  Daniele Resca (m) /  Jessica Rossi (f)
 Men's Senior Double Trap winner:  Vitaly Fokeev
 Senior Skeet winners:  Gabriele Rossetti (m) /  Dania Jo Vizzi (f)
 Junior Trap winners:  Clement Francis Andre Bourgue (m) /  Maria Lucia Palmitessa (f)
 Junior Men's Double Trap winner:  James Dedman
 Junior Skeet winners:  Emil Kjelgaard Petersen (m) /  Katharina Monika Jacob (f)

Skateboarding

World Championships
 November 28 & 29: Teutonia IGSA World Championships in  Teutônia

Street League Skateboarding
World Tour
 March 4 & 5: Tampa Pro in  Tampa
 Winner:  Louie Lopez, 2nd place:  Luan Oliveira, 3rd place:  Kevin Hoefler
 May 20 & 21: SLS Nike SB Pro Open in  Barcelona
 Winner:  Nyjah Huston, 2nd place:  Shane O'Neill, 3rd place:  Yuto Horigome 
 June 24: Stop #1 in  Munich
 Winner:  Nyjah Huston, 2nd place:  Yuto Horigome, 3rd place:  Carlos Ribeiro
 August 13: Stop #2 in  Chicago
 Winner:  Dashawn Jordan, 2nd place:  Torey Pudwill, 3rd place:  Shane O'Neill
 September 15: SLS Nike SB Super Crown World Championship in  Los Angeles (final)

Downhill World Cup
 February 17 & 18: Newton's in  Bathurst, New South Wales
 Winners:  Mauritz Armfelt (m) /  Emily Pross (f)
 Masters winner:  Adam Yates
 Junior winner:  Taylor Cook
 Luge winner:  Abdil Mahdzan
 April 14 – 16: Keeping it High in  Maragondon
 Winners:  Douglas da Silva (m) /  Elissa Mah
 Masters winner:  Benjamin Hay
 Junior winner:  Taylor Cook
 Luge winner:  Abdil Mahdzan
 April 28 – 30: Arirang Hill Fest in  Jeongseon County
 Winners:  Aaron Hampshire (m) /  Kaila Dasol Jong
 Masters winner:  Benjamin Hay
 Junior winner:  Taylor Cook
 Luge winner:  Abdil Mahdzan
 May 26 – 28: Yaku Raymi Water Fest in  Huallin
 Winners:  Carlos Paixão (m) /  Candy Dungan (f)
 Masters winner:  Leonardo Discacciati
 Junior winner:  Bruno Vidal Vieira
 Luge winner:  Ryan Farmer
 June 9 – 11: Apac Championship in  Nova Lima
 Winners:  Thiago Gomes Lessa (m) /  Melissa Brogni
 Masters winner:  Adriano Silveira
 Junior winner:  Murilo Araujo
 Luge winner:  Ryan Farmer
 June 17 & 18: La Leonera DH in  La Leonera
 Winners:  Thiago Gomes Lessa (m) /  Luana Campos (f)
 Masters winner:  Marco Vidales
 Junior winner:  Bruno Vidal Vieira
 Luge winner:  Ryan Farmer
 July 13 – 16: King's Gate in  Hinterstoder
 Winners:  Tristan Cardillo (m) /  Emily Pross (f)
 Masters winner:  Nicolas Desmarais
 Junior winner:  Tristan Cardillo
 Luge winner:  Mikel Echegaray Diez
 July 19 – 22: Kozakov Challenge in  Kozákov Mountain
 Winners:  Thiago Gomes Lessa (m) /  Emily Pross (f)
 Masters winner:  Nicolas Desmarais
 Junior winner:  Tristan Cardillo
 Luge winner:  Mikel Echegaray Diez
 July 26 – 29: Verdicchio Race in  Poggio Cupro
 Winners:  Tristan Cardillo (m) /  Lyde Begue
 Masters winner:  Uldis Tretmanis
 Junior winner:  Tristan Cardillo
 Luge winner:  Kolby Parks
 August 3 – 6: Teolo Euroskate in 
 Winners:  Carlos Paixão (m) /  Emily Pross (f)
 Masters winner:  Damian Derek Blanquer Gelez
 Junior winner:  Tristan Cardillo
 Luge winner:  Mikel Echegaray Diez
September 8 – 10: Killington Throwdown (final) in

Ski jumping

Snooker

Snooker season 2016/2017
May
 May 5 – 8, 2016: Vienna Snooker Open in  Vienna
  Peter Ebdon defeated  Mark Davis, 5–1.
June
 June 8 – 12, 2016: Pink Ribbon in  Gloucester
  Jamie Jones defeated  David Grace, 4–3.
 June 12 – 16, 2016: China Professional Championship in  Fuzhou
  Zhang Anda defeated  Zhou Yuelong, 5–1.
 June 22 – 24, 2016: 2016 Riga Masters in  Riga
  Neil Robertson defeated  Michael Holt, 5–2.
July
 July 5 – 9: 2016 Indian Open in  Hyderabad
  Anthony McGill defeated  Kyren Wilson 5–2.
 July 25 – 31: 2016 World Open in  Yushan
  Ali Carter defeated  Joe Perry 10–8.
August
 August 24–28: 2016 Paul Hunter Classic in  Fürth
  Mark Selby defeated  Tom Ford 4–2.
September
 September 5 – 10: 2016 Six-red World Championship in  Bangkok
  Ding Junhui defeated  Stuart Bingham 8–7.
 September 19 – 25: 2016 Shanghai Masters in  Shanghai
  Ding Junhui defeated  Mark Selby 10–6.
October
 October 3 – 9: 2016 European Masters in  Bucharest
  Judd Trump defeated  Ronnie O'Sullivan 9–8.
 October 10 – 16: 2016 English Open in  Manchester
  Liang Wenbo defeated  Judd Trump 9–6.
November
 November 1 – 5: 2016 China Championship in  Guangzhou
  John Higgins defeated  Stuart Bingham 10–7.
 November 7 – 12: 2016 Champion of Champions in  Coventry
  John Higgins defeated  Ronnie O'Sullivan 10–7.
 November 14 – 20: 2016 Northern Ireland Open in  Belfast
  Mark King defeated  Barry Hawkins 9–8.
 November 22 – December 4: 2016 UK Championship in  York
  Mark Selby defeated  Ronnie O'Sullivan 10–7.
December
 December 12 – 18: 2016 Scottish Open in  Glasgow
  Marco Fu defeated  John Higgins 9–4.
January
January 15 – 22: 2017 Masters in  London
 Ronnie O'Sullivan defeated  Joe Perry 10–7.
February
February 1 – 5: 2017 German Masters in  Berlin
  Anthony Hamilton defeated  Ali Carter 9–6.
February 6 – 12: 2017 World Grand Prix in  Preston
  Barry Hawkins defeated  Ryan Day 10–7.
February 13 – 19: 2017 Welsh Open in  Cardiff
  Stuart Bingham defeated  Judd Trump 9–8.
February 23 – 26: 2017 Snooker Shoot Out in  Watford
  Anthony McGill defeated  Xiao Guodong 1–0 (67–19).
March
March 1 – 2: 2017 Championship League Winners' Group in  Coventry
  John Higgins defeated  Ryan Day 3–0.
March 3 – 5: 2017 Gibraltar Open in 
  Shaun Murphy defeated  Judd Trump 4–2.
March 6 – 12: 2017 Players Championship in  Llandudno
  Judd Trump defeated  Marco Fu 10–8.
March 22 – 24: 2017 World Seniors Championship in  Scunthorpe
  Peter Lines defeated  John Parrott 4–0.
March 27 – April 2: 2017 China Open in  Beijing
  Mark Selby defeated  Mark Williams 10–8.
April
April 15 – May 1: 2017 World Snooker Championship in  Sheffield
  Mark Selby defeated  John Higgins 18–15.

Women's snooker season 2016/2017

August 25 – 28, 2016: 2016 Paul Hunter Ladies Classic in  Fürth
  Ng On Yee defeated  Reanne Evans, 4–1.
October 8 – 9, 2016: 2016 UK Ladies Championship in  Leeds
  Reanne Evans defeated  Tatjana Vasiljeva, 5–1.
January 14 – 15: 2017 Women's Masters in  Derby
  Reanne Evans defeated  So Man Yan, 4–0.
February 18: 2017 Connie Gough Memorial Trophy in  Dunstable
  Maria Catalano defeated  Rebecca Granger, 4–2.
March 13 – 19: 2017 World Women's Snooker Championship in  Toa Payoh
  Ng On Yee defeated  Vidya Pillai, 6–5.
April 7 – 11: 2017 World Festival of Women's Snooker in  Leeds
  Ng On Yee won the World Women's 6-Red Championship
  Ng On Yee won the World Women's 10-Red Championship
  Emma Bonney won the World Women's Seniors Championship
  Emma Parker won the World Women's U21 Championship
  Emma Bonney &  Vicky Shirley won the World Women's Pairs Championship
  Katrina Wan &  Sanderson Lam won the World Mixed Pairs Championship

Amateur snooker championships

March 5 – 8: 2017 EBSA European Under-18 Snooker Championship in  Nicosia
 Jackson Page defeated  Amir Nardeia, 5–3.
March 8 – 12: 2017 EBSA European Under-21 Snooker Championship in  Nicosia
 Alexander Ursenbacher defeated  Jackson Page, 6–4.
March 13 – 19: 2017 EBSA European Snooker Championship in  Nicosia
 Chris Totten defeated  Andres Petrov, 7–3.
March 15 – 18: 2017 OBSF Oceania Snooker Championship in  Albury
 Matthew Bolton defeated  Ben Judge, 6–3.
April 8 – 14: 2017 ACBS Asian Under-21 Snooker Championship in  Chandigarh
 Yuan Sijun defeated  Fan Zhengyi, 6–2.
April 12 – 14: 2017 ACBS Asian Ladies Snooker Championship (debut event) in  Chandigarh
 Ng On Yee defeated  Waratthanun Sukritthanes, 3–2.
April 22 – 28: 2017 ACBS Asian Snooker Championship in  Doha
 Lyu Haotian defeated  Pankaj Advani, 6–3.
May 12 – 22: 2017 ABSF African Snooker Championships in  Hammamet
 Basem Eltahhan defeated  Wael Talaat, 6–5.
July 8 – 11: 2017 IBSF World Under-18 Snooker Championship in  Beijing
Men:  Muhammad Naseem Akhtar defeated  Lei Peifan, 5–3.
Women:  Nutcharat Wongharuthai defeated  Siripaporn Nuanthakhamjan, 3–2.
July 12 – 16: 2017 IBSF World Under-21 Snooker Championship in  Beijing
Men:  Fan Zhengyi defeated  Luo Honghao, 7–6.
Women:  Nutcharat Wongharuthai defeated  Xia Yuying, 5–3.
October 1 – 8: 2017 World Open Under-16 Snooker Championships (debut event) in  Saint Petersburg
Boys:  Dylan Emery defeated  Mikhail Terekhov, 4–1.
Girls:  Anupama Ramachandran defeated  Keerthana Pandian, 3–1.
November 17 – 27: 2017 IBSF World Snooker Championship in  Doha
Men:  Pankaj Advani defeated  Amir Sarkhosh, 8–2.
Women:  Wendy Jans defeated  Waratthanun Sukritthanes, 5–2.
Masters:  Darren Morgan defeated  Alok Kumar, 5–1.

Snowboarding

Softball

International softball championships
 June 25 – July 1: 2017 Women's Softball European Championship in  Bollate
 The  defeated , 7–1, to win their tenth Women's Softball European Championship title. 
 July 5 – 9: 2017 World Cup of Softball in  Oklahoma City
  took third place.
 July 7 – 16: 2017 Men's Softball World Championship in  Whitehorse, Yukon
  defeated , 6–4, to win their seventh Men's Softball World Championship title.
  took third place.
 July 10 – 17: 2017 Canada Cup International Softball Championship in  Surrey, British Columbia
 For results, click here.
 July 24 – 30: 2017 Junior Women's Softball World Championship in  Clearwater, Florida
 The  defeated , 13–4, to win their second consecutive and sixth overall Junior Women's Softball World Championship title.
  took third place.

Little League softball tournaments
 July 30 – August 5: 2017 Junior League Softball World Series in  Kirkland
  Team Central ( Poland Community Softball Association) defeated  Team Host ( Washington District 9), 7–1, in the final.
 July 30 – August 6: 2017 Senior League Softball World Series in  Lower Sussex
  Team Host District 3 ( Georgetown) defeated  Team Asia-Pacific (Negros Occidental), 4–0, in the final.
 August 9 – 16: 2017 Little League Softball World Series in  Portland
  Team Southwest ( Lake Air LL) defeated  Team Southeast ( Rowan LL), 7–2, in the final.

Speed skating

Sport climbing

Squash

Surfing

Table tennis

Taekwondo

Telemark skiing

Tennis

Triathlon

Volleyball

Water polo

Water Ski & Wakeboard

Weightlifting

Wrestling

References

 
Sports by year